C. elegans most commonly refers to the model round worm Caenorhabditis elegans. It may also refer to any of the species below. They are listed, first in taxonomic order (including synonyms) and, second, alphabetically.

The dagger symbol (†) indicates an extinct clade.

Domain Eukaryota (eukaryotes), unranked Unikonta (unikonts)

Unranked Amoebozoa

Subphylum Lobosa, class Tubulinea, order Arcellinida
 Centropyxiella elegans, a species of family Centropyxidae found in the European waters of the North Atlantic Ocean

Phylum Mycetozoa

Class Myxogastria

Order Stemonitida
 Collaria elegans (syn. Comatricha elegans), a species of family Stemonitidaceae

Order Liceida
 Cribraria elegans, a slime mold of family Cribrariaceae found in the United States, Europe and Japan

Class Dictyosteliomycetes / Dictyostelea

Order Dictyosteliales
 Calospeira elegans, a slime mold (Dictyosteliales incertae sedis)

Unranked Opisthokonta (opisthokonts), unranked Holozoa

Class Choanoflagellatea

Order Craspedida 
Family Codonosigidae
 Cladospongia elegans, a species found in India
 Codonosiga elegans, a species

Eukaryotes, unikonts, opisthokonts, unranked Holozoa, kingdom Animalia (animals)

Subkingdom Parazoa

Phylum Porifera (sponges)

Class Calcarea (calcareous sponges)
 Consobrinomia elegans, a species from the Mediterranean

Class Demospongiae (Demosponges)

Order Poecilosclerida
 Clathria elegans, a species of family Microcionidae found in the United States part of the North Atlantic Ocean
 Clathrissa elegans, a synonym for Tedania elegans, a species of family Tedaniidae found in Australia
 Crella elegans (syn. Cribella elegans or Cribrella elegans), a marine species of family Crellidae found in the Adriatic

Order Haplosclerida
Family Callyspongiidae
 Callyspongia elegans (syn. Cladochalina elegans), a species found in Indonesia
 Chalinissa elegans, a synonym for Callyspongia serpentina, a species found in Australia and New Zealand
 Chalinopsilla elegans, a synonym for Dactylia elegans, a species found in Western Australia
Family Chalinidae
 Chalinodendron elegans , a synonym for Haliclona elegans, a species found in southeast Australia

Order Dictyoceratida
 Carteriospongia elegans, a synonym for Carteriospongia foliascens, a species (Thorectidae)

Order Hadromerida
 Caulospongia elegans, a species of family Suberitidae found in Australia

Order Spirophorida
 Craniella elegans, a marine species of family Tetillidae found in southern India and Sri Lanka

Order Tetractinellida
 †Cupulospongia elegans, an extinct species (incertae sedis) from the Cretaceous of France

Class Hexactinellida (glass sponges)

Order Hexactinosa
 †Cribrospongia elegans, an extinct species of family Cribrospongiidae from the Jurassic of Germany

Order Lyssacinosa
 Caulophacus elegans, a species (Rossellidae, Lanuginellinae) found in Central Kuroshio Current, near Japan
 Corbitella elegans, a species (Euplectellidae) found in the Banda Sea in the Maluku Islands of Indonesia

Subkingdom Eumetazoa

Phylum Cnidaria (cnidarians), subphylum Medusozoa (jellyfish), class Hydrozoa (hydrozoans)

Subclass Hydroidolina, order Leptomedusae
 Cryptolaria elegans, a synonym for Acryptolaria elegans, a thecate hydroid (Lafoeidae) found in the Gulf of Mexico

Phylum Cnidaria (cnidarians), class Anthozoa (corals, sea pens and gorgonians)

Subclass Hexacorallia (hexacorals)

Order †Rugosa (rugose or horn corals)
 †Cardiaphyllum elegans, an extinct species from the Upper Carboniferous of China

Order Scleractinia (stony corals)
 †Calamophylliopsis elegans, a species (Dermosmiliidae) from the Cretaceous of China
 †Chorisastrea elegans, an extinct species (Calamophylliidae) found in Switzerland
 †Codonosmilia elegans, an extinct species (Rhipidogyridae) from the Jurassic of Switzerland
 Coeloria elegans, a species (incertae sedis)
 †Colpophyllia elegans, an extinct species (Mussidae)
 †Comophyllia elegans, an extinct species (Latomeandridae) from the Jurassic of France
 †Conosmilia elegans, an extinct species (Flabellidae) from the Tertiary of South Australia
 †Cyathophora elegans, a synonym for Holocystis elegans, a species (Cyathophoridae) from the Cretaceous of Mexico, Spain and the United Kingdom
 Cycloseris elegans, a mushroom coral (Fungiidae) found on the west coast of America

Order Stauriida
 †Carinthiaphyllum elegans, an extinct species (Geyerophyllidae) from the Carboniferous of China

Order †Tabulata (tabulate corals)
 †Caliapora elegans an extinct species (†Favositidae) from the Devonian of the Urals
 †Catenipora elegans, an extinct species (†Halysitidae) from the Silurian of Estonia
 †Coenites elegans, an extinct species (†Coenitidae) from the Devonian of Altai

Subclass Octocorallia (octocorals)

Order Alcyonacea (soft corals)
 Callogorgia elegans (syn. Callicella elegans), a species (Primnoidae) found in the western North Pacific
 Chrysogorgia elegans, a species (Chrysogorgiidae) found in the Gulf of Mexico, the Mediterranean Sea and the North Atlantic Ocean
 Cyathopodium elegans, a species (Clavulariidae) found in the western part of the Atlantic Ocean

Order Pennatulacea (sea pens)
 Cavernularia elegans, a species (Veretillidae) from the North Atlantic Ocean

Subclass Myxozoa (myxozoans)

Order Bivalvulida
 Ceratomyxa elegans, a species (Ceratomyxidae) found in the Mediterranean and the Argentinian seas where it is a parasite of toadfishes

Eumetazoa, clade Bilateria (bilaterians), superphylum Deuterostomia (deuterostomes)

Phylum Echinodermata (echinoderms)

Class Asteroidea (sea stars)

Order Valvatida
Family Goniasteridae
 Calliaster elegans, a species
 †Comptonia elegans, an extinct species from the Cretaceous of France

Family Ophidiasteridae
 †Chariaster elegans, an extinct species from the Cretaceous of Egypt

Class Crinoidea (crinoids)

Order Cladida
 †Calceolispongia elegans, an extinct species (Calceolispongiidae) that lived along the shores of what corresponds to Timor and Western Australia today

Order Disparida
 †Cicerocrinus elegans, an extinct species (Pisocrinidae) known from the Silurian of the United Kingdom

Order Comatulida
 Clarkometra elegans, a feather star (Colobometridae) found from southwest Mindanao in the Philippines to the Bonin Islands, Japan

Class Echinoidea (sea urchins)

Order Arbacioida
 †Coelopleurus elegans, a species (Arbaciidae) from the Pleistocene of Japan

Order Cassiduloida
 †Catopygus elegans, a synonym for Studeria elegans, an extinct species (Neolampadidae)

Order Cidaroida
 †Cidaris elegans Münster, 1826 (syn. †Cidarites elegans), a fossil species (Cidaridae) from the Jurassic of France
 Cidaris elegans (A. Agassiz, 1879), a synonym for Histocidaris elegans, an extant species (Histocidaridae)

Class †Edrioasteroidea (edrioasteroids)

Order unknown
 †Cambraster elegans, an extinct species (family unknown) from the Cambrian

Class Holothuroidea (sea cucumbers)

Order Apodida
 †Chiridota elegans (syn. †Chirodota elegans), a species (Chiridotidae) from the Pliocene of Europe

Phylum Chordata (chordates), subphylum Tunicata (tunicates)

Class Ascidiacea (ascidians or sea squirts)

Order Aplousobranchia
 Clavelina elegans, a species (Clavelinidae) found in Japan

Order Stolidobranchia (stolidobranchian sea squirts)
 Chorizocarpa elegans, a synonym for Botryllus elegans, a species (Styelidae) found in Mozambique and South Africa
 Culeolus elegans, a species (Pyuridae) found in New Caledonia

Chordates, subphylum Vertebrata (vertebrates)

(Informal group jawless fishes) class Conodonta (conodonts)

Order Conodontophorida (or unknown)
 †Curtognathus elegans, an extinct species (Distacodontidae) from the Ordovician of Siberia

(Informal group jawless fishes) class Osteostraci

(Subclass †Cornuata) order †Cephalaspidida
 †Cephalaspis elegans, a synonym for †Zychaspis elegans, an extinct species (†Scolenaspididae) from the Devonian of Ukraine

Class Chondrichthyes (cartilaginous fishes), subclass Holocephali

Order Petalodontiformes
 †Chomatodus elegans, a prehistoric species

Cartilaginous fishes, elasmobranchs (subclass Elasmobranchii)

Order Carcharhiniformes
 Carcharias elegans, a synonym for Carcharhinus melanopterus, the blacktip reef shark, a requiem shark (Carcharhinidae) inhabiting the tropical coral reefs of the Indian and Pacific oceans

Order †Cladoselachiformes
Family †Cladoselachidae
 †Cladodus elegans, an extinct species from the Carboniferous period
 †Cladoselache elegans, an extinct shark from the Devonian period

Order Ctenacanthiformes
 †Ctenacanthus elegans, an extinct species (Ctenacanthidae) from the Carboniferous period

Order †Synechodontiformes
 †Cosmacanthus elegans, a synonym for †Nemacanthus elegans, an extinct species (†Paleospinacidae) from the Triassic of Idaho, United States

Superclass Osteichthyes (bony fishes), class Actinopterygii (ray-finned fishes)

Order Perciformes
 Callionymus elegans, a synonym for Callionymus lyra, the common dragonet, a species (Callionymidae) widespread in the eastern Atlantic
 Clinus elegans, a synonym for Calliclinus geniguttatus, a marine species (Labrisomidae) native to the Pacific coast of Chile and the Atlantic coast of Argentina
 Coryphaena elegans, a synonym for Luvaris imperialis, the louvar, a marine species (Luvaridae) found in surface waters of temperate and tropical oceans throughout the world
 Cybiosarda elegans, a marine scombrid (Scombridae) found in coastal and oceanic waters of northern Australia and southern New Guinea

Cichlids (family Cichlidae)
 Crenicara elegans, a synonym for Crenicara punctulatum, the checkerboard cichlid, a species (Geophaginae) native to creeks and rivers in the Amazon and Essequibo basins in South America
 Crenicichla elegans, a synonym for Crenicichla reticulata, a species (Cichlinae) native to South America

Order Cyprinodontiformes
Pupfishes (family Cyprinodontidae)
 Cyprinodon elegans, the Comanche Springs pupfish, a species found in the United States
Rivulids or South American killifish (family Rivulidae)
 Cynodonichthys elegans, a species found in Colombia
 Cynolebias elegans, a synonym for Nematolebias whitei, the Rio pearlfish, a species native to South America
Stone loaches (family Nemacheilidae)
 Cobitis elegans, a synonym for Triplophysa stolickai, the Tibetan stone loach, a species found in southern and central Asia

Order Siluriformes (catfishes)
 Corydoras elegans (syn. Corydorus elegans), the elegant corydoras or elegant catfish, a freshwater armored catfish (Callichthyidae) found in the Upper Amazon River basin

Order Cypriniformes
 Crossocheilus elegans, a cyprinid (Cyprinidae) found in northern Borneo, Indonesia

Order Characiformes
Toothless characins (family Curimatidae)
 Curimata elegans or Curimatus elegans, synonyms for Steindachnerina elegans, a species found in rivers in Bahia and Minas Gerais, Brazil
 Curimatus elegans paraguayensis, a synonym for Curimatella dorsalis, a species from the Orinoco, Amazon, Tocantins and Paraguay-lower Paraná River basins

Order Scorpaeniformes
 Centridermichthys elegans, a synonym for Bero elegans, a sculpin (Cottidae) native to the northwestern Pacific Ocean

Order Salmoniformes
 Coregonus elegans, a synonym for Coregonus pollan, the pollan, a freshwater whitefish (salmonidae) known only from five Irish lakes

Bony fishes, class Sarcopterygii (lobe-finned fishes)
 †Ceratodus elegans, an extinct lungfish (Ceratodontiformes, Ptychoceratodontidae) from the Triassic of Germany
 †Coelacanthus elegans, a synonym for Rhabdoderma elegans, an extinct coelacanth fish (Rhabdodermatidae) that lived in the Carboniferous

Chordates, vertebrates, superclass Tetrapoda (tetrapods)

Class Amphibia (amphibians)

Order Anura (frogs)
 Cardioglossa elegans, a species (Arthroleptidae) found in Cameroon, Equatorial Guinea and Gabon
 Cornufer elegans, a species (Ceratobatrachidae) endemic to Papua New Guinea

Class Aves (birds)

Order Apodiformes
 †Chlorostilbon elegans, Gould's emerald, a presumed extinct hummingbird (Trochilidae) likely from Jamaica or the Bahamas

Order Charadriiformes
 Charadrius elegans, a synonym for Charadrius alexandrinus, the Kentish plover, a cosmopolitan species (Charadriidae)

Order Galliformes (galliforms)
 Callipepla elegans, a synonym for Callipepla douglasii, the elegant quail, a species (Odontophoridae) endemic to Pacific-slope thorn forest of northwestern Mexico

Order Gruiformes
 Coturnicops elegans, a synonym for Sarothrura elegans, the buff-spotted flufftail, a species (Sarothruridae) found in Africa

Order Passeriformes
 Calocitta elegans, a synonym for Calocitta colliei, the black-throated magpie-jay, a species (Corvidae) found in northwestern Mexico

Order Piciformes
 Celeus elegans, the chestnut woodpecker, a species (Picidae) found in South America

Order Tinamiformes
 Calodromas elegans or Calopezus elegans, synonyms for Eudromia elegans, the elegant crested tinamou or martineta tinamou, a species (Tinamidae) found in southern Chile and Argentina

Class Reptilia (reptiles)

Order Squamata
Suborder Serpentes (snakes)
Family Colubridae (colubrid snakes)
 Calamaria elegans, a synonym for Calamaria modesta, a species (Calamariinae) found in Java
 Coronella elegans Günther, 1858, a synonym for Taeniophallus occipitalis, a species (Dipsadinae) found in South America
 Coronella elegans Jan, 1863, a synonym for Meizodon regularis, the eastern crowned smooth snake, a species (Colubrinae) found in Africa

Family Lamprophiidae (lamprophiids)
 Coluber elegans, a synonym for Psammophis elegans, the elegant sand racer, a species (Psammophiinae) found in tropical Africa

Family Viperidae (vipers)
 Craspedocephalus elegans, a synonym for Trimeresurus elegans, the elegant pitviper, a species (Crotalinae) endemic to Japan

Family Boidae (boas)
 Cursoria elegans or Cusoria elegans, synonyms for Eryx elegans, a species (Erycinae) found in western Central Asia

Suborder Lacertilia (lizards)
Family Gekkonidae (geckos)
 Coleonyx elegans, the Yucatán banded gecko, an eyelid gecko (Eublepharinae) found in Mexico, Guatemala and Belize
 Cyrtopodion elegans, a synonym for Cyrtopodion elongatum, the Yangihissar gecko, a species (Gekkoninae) found in northwest China and Mongolia

Order Testudines (turtles)
 Chersine elegans, a synonym for Geochelone elegans, the Indian star tortoise, a species (Testudinidae) found in dry areas and scrub forest in India and Sri Lanka
 Chrysemys elegans, a synonym for Trachemys scripta elegans, the red-eared slider, a pond turtle (Emydidae)
 Cyclanorbis elegans, the Nubian flapshell turtle, a softshell (Trionychidae) found in Africa

Clade Suchia, clade Paracrocodylomorpha
 †Chatterjeea elegans, a synonym for †Shuvosaurus inexpectatus, an extinct species of beaked reptiles (†Shuvosauridae) from the Late Triassic of Texas

Clade Dinosauria (dinosaurs), order Saurischia
 †Chirostenotes elegans, a synonym for Leptorhynchos elegans, an extinct species of oviraptorosaurian dinosaur (†Caenagnathidae) from the late Cretaceous of Alberta, Montana and South Dakota

Unranked Mesoeucrocodylia
 †Cricosaurus elegans, an extinct marine crocodyliform (Metriorhynchidae) from the Late Jurassic to Early Cretaceous

Order †Pterosauria
 †Ctenochasma elegans, an extinct species of pterosaurs (†Ctenochasmatidae) of the Late Jurassic of Germany and France

Class Mammalia (mammals)

Order Carnivora (carnivorans)
 †Cynodictis elegans, an extinct species of bear dog (†Amphicyonidae) from the Eocene–Oligocene of Eurasia

Order Artiodactyla (even-toed ungulates)
 †Caenotherium elegans or Cainotherium elegans, synonyms for Cainotherium laticurvatum, an extinct species of rabbit-sized herbivores (†Cainotheriidae) from the Eocene-Miocene of Europe
 †Choilodon elegans, an extinct species (?Tragulidae, the chevrotains) found in phosphorites in Quercy, France

Order Afrosoricida
 Chrysochloris elegans, a synonym for Chrysochloris asiatica, the Cape golden mole, a small insectivorous (Chrysochloridae) found in South Africa

Order Erinaceomorpha
 †Cayluxotherium elegans, a synonym for †Neurogymnurus cayluxi, an extinct species of hedgehogs (Erinaceidae) from the Oligocene of France
 †Camphotherium elegans or †Comphotherium elegans, synonyms for †Tetracus nanus, an extinct species of hedgehogs (Erinaceidae) from the Oligocene of Belgium, France and southern England

Order Rodentia (rodents)
 Capromys elegans, a synonym for Phloeomys cumingi, the southern giant slender-tailed cloud rat, a species (Muridae) found only in the Philippines
 Citellus elegans, a synonym for Urocitellus elegans, the Wyoming ground squirrel, a species (Sciuridae) endemic to the northwestern United States

Phylum Hemichordata (hemichordates)

Graptolites (class †Graptolithina)

Order †Dendroidea
 †Callograptus elegans, an extinct species (†Dendrograptidae) from the Quebec Group

Phylum Xenacoelomorpha, class Acoela (acoels)
 Convoluta elegans, a species (Convolutidae) found in the Black Sea

Eumetazoa, bilaterians, unranked Protostomia (protostomes)

Superphylum Ecdysozoa, phylum Nematoda (nematodes or roundworms)

Class Chromadorea

Order Araeolaimida
 Chronogaster elegans, a species (Leptolaimidae) found in fresh water in the United States

Order Rhabditida
 Caenorhabditis elegans, a species (Rhabditidae) extensively used as a model in developmental biology
 Craspedonema elegans, a parasitic species (Bunonematidae) found in Brazil
 Cucullanus elegans, an endoparasite (Cucullanidae) of the European perch

Order Strongylida
Strongyloidea, family Chabertiidae
 Cloacina elegans, a parasite of marsupials in Australia
 Cyclostrongylus elegans, an oesophageal parasite (Cloacininae) of macropodid marsupials in Australia

Order Monhysterida
 Cyartonema elegans, a free-living marine species (Cyartonematidae) found in Scotland

Class Enoplea

Order Dorylaimida
 Crassolabium elegans, a species (Qudsianematidae) from the northern Great Plains

Class Secernentea

Order Camallanida
 Camallanus elegans, a synonym for Camallanus lacustris, a freshwater species (Camallanidae) parasitic of fish

Order Tylenchida
 Chilenchus elegans, a parasitic species (Tylenchidae) found in Chile

Ecdysozoa, phylum Arthropoda (arthropods)

Subphylum Hexapoda (hexapods), class Insecta (insects)

Order †Alienoptera
 †Caputoraptor elegans, an extinct species (†Alienopteridae) from the Late Cretaceous of Myanmar

Order Blattodea (cockroaches)
 Calolampra elegans, a giant cockroach (Blaberidae) found in Queensland, Australia
 Corydia elegans, a synonym for Eucorydia aenea, a species (Corydiidae) found in Asia

Order Coleoptera (beetles and weevils)
Suborder Polyphaga
Infraorder Cucujiformia
Superfamily Chrysomeloidea

Family Cerambycidae (longhorn beetles)

Subfamily Cerambycinae
Tribe Elaphidiini
 Centrocerum elegans, a species found in Brazil, Bolivia, Paraguay and Argentina
 Cordylomera elegans, a species found in South Africa
Tribe Callichromatini
 Callichroma elegans, Cerambix elegans or Cerambyx elegans, synonyms for Mionochroma elegans, a species found in Guadeloupe, Grenada, Dominica and St. Lucia
 Callichroma elegans Haldeman, 1847 nec Olivier, 1790, a synonym for Plinthocoelium suaveolens
Other tribes
 Calliprason elegans, a species (Stenoderini) found in New Zealand
 Championa elegans, a species (Heteropsini) found in Mexico
 Clytus elegans, a synonym for Neoclytus scutellaris a species (Clytini) found in the United States
 Coleoxestia elegans or Criodion elegans, synonyms for Poeciloxestia elegans a species (Cerambycini) found in Brazil

Subfamily Lamiinae (flat-faced longhorns)
 Cacia elegans, a species (Mesosini)
 Callienispia elegans, a synonym for Egesina elegans, a species (Pteropliini)
 Catharesthes elegans, a species (Acanthocinini)
 Ceroplesis elegans, a species (Ceroplesini) found in Saudi Arabia and Yemen
 Chariesthes elegans, a synonym for Chariesthes bella, a species (Tragocephalini) found in Africa
 Cyriocrates elegans, a synonym for Anoplophora elegans, a species (Lamiini) found in Southeast Asia

Family Chrysomelidae (leaf beetles)

Subfamily Chrysomelinae
 Callidemum elegans, currently Paropsimorpha elegans, a species found in Australia
 Calligrapha elegans or Chrysomela elegans, synonyms for Calligrapha californica, a species (Chrysomelini) found in the United States and Canada
 Crosita elegans, a species with a Palaearctic distribution
 Cyrtonus elegans (syn. Eumolpus elegans), a species found in Portugal

Subfamily Cassidinae (tortoise beetles)
 Callispa elegans, a species found in southern Asia
 Callistola elegans a species (Cryptonychini) found in the western Pacific
 Coptocycla elegans, a species found in Brazil

Subfamily Galerucinae
 Cneorane elegans, a species (Galerucini) found in Japan and Korea

Family Megalopodidae
 Colobaspis elegans, a species (Megalopodinae) found in Taiwan

Superfamily Cucujoidea

Family Endomychidae (handsome fungus beetles)
 Chondria elegans, a species found in Malaysia
 Corynomalus elegans, a species (Lycoperdininae) found in Ecuador
 Cymbachus elegans, a species (Lycoperdininae) found in Laos
Family Latridiidae (minute brown scavenger beetles)
 Cartodere elegans, a species found in Europe
Family Nitidulidae (sap beetles)
 Calosphaera elegans or Cryptarcha elegans, synonyms for Eucalosphaera elegans a species (Cryptarchinae) found in Perak, Malaysia

Superfamily Cleroidea

Family Cleridae (checkered beetles)
 Callotillus elegans, a synonym for Neocallotillus elegans, a species (Tillinae) found in Texas, California and Arizona
 Chariessa elegans, a species found in the United States

Family Melyridae (soft-winged flower beetles)
 Carphurus elegans, a species (Malachiinae, Carphurini) found in Queensland, Australia
 Clanoptilus elegans, a species found in Europe

Superfamily Curculionoidea (weevils)

Family Curculionidae (true weevils)
 Callizonus elegans, a synonym for Praepodes elegans, a species (not yet assigned to a subfamily) found in Cuba
 Ceutorhynchus elegans, a species (Baridinae, Ceutorhynchini) with a Palaearctic distribution
 Coniatus elegans, a species (Hyperinae) found in Syria
 Conotrachelus elegans, the pecan gall curculio, a species (Molytinae) found in North America
 Cryptorhynchus elegans, a species (Cryptorhynchinae) found in North America

Subfamily Curculioninae
 Centrinaspis elegans, a species found in Brazil
 Cleopus elegans, a species (Cionini) found in Italy

Subfamily Dryophthorinae
 Calandra elegans, a species
 Curculio elegans, a synonym for Sphenophorus abbreviatus, a species (Rhynchophorini) found in Europe
 Cyrtotrachelus elegans, a species (Rhynchophorini) found in the Philippines

Subfamily Entiminae
 Chaerodrys elegans, a synonym for Metadrosus bellus, a species (Polydrosini) found in southern Europe
 Chiloneus elegans, a species (Sciaphilini) found in Greece
 Compsus elegans, a species (Eustylini)
 Coptorhynchus elegans, a species (Celeuthetini) found in Indonesia

Subfamily Scolytinae (bark beetles)
 Cnesinus elegans a species (Bothrosternini) found in Mexico
 Coptodryas elegans, a species (Xyleborini) found in Myanmar, India, Indonesia and the Pacific
 Cosmoderes elegans, a species (Cryphalini) found in New Guinea

Family Attelabidae (leaf-rolling weevils)
 Catalabus elegans, a species found in India

Family Brentidae (straight-snouted weevils)
 Cerobates elegans, a species found in Africa

Superfamily Tenebrionoidea, family Tenebrionidae (darkling beetles)
 Cephalostenus elegans, a species (Tenebrioninae) found in Greece
 Colposcelis elegans a species (Pimeliinae, Tentyriini) with a Palaearctic distribution in Asia
 Cryptochile elegans, a species (Pimeliinae, Cryptochilini) found in Kenya

Infraorder Scarabaeiformia
Superfamily Scarabaeoidea
Family Scarabaeidae (scarab beetles)
 Ceraspis elegans, a species (Melolonthinae, Macrodactylini) found in Brazil and Central America (Honduras)
 Canthon elegans or Choeridium elegans, synonyms for Canthon quadriguttatus, a species (Scarabaeinae, Canthonini) found in Brazil, Colombia and Suriname
Subfamily Cetoniinae (flower chafers)
 Calopotosia elegans, a synonym for Protaetia elegans, a species (Cetoniini) found in Taiwan
 Cetonia elegans Leoni, 1910, a synonym for Cetonia aurata pisana, a subspecies (Cetoniini) of the rose chafer
 Cetonia elegans Fabricius, 1781, a synonym for Heterorrhina elegans, a species (Goliathini) found in India and Sri Lanka
 Chrysoliocola elegans
 Coptomia elegans, a synonym for Pyrrhopoda elegans, a species (Stenotarsiini) found in Madagascar
Subfamily Dynastinae (rhinoceros beetles)
 Coryphocera elegans, a species found in Senegal
 Cyclocephala elegans, a synonym for Cyclocephala melanocephala, a species found in North and Central America

Family Lucanidae (stag beetles)
 Cladognathus elegans, a synonym for Digonophorus elegans, a species found in India

Infraorder Elateriformia
Superfamily Elateroidea
Family Elateridae (click beetles)
 Cardiophorus elegans, a species found in Chile
 Cardiorhinus elegans, a species found in Brazil
 †Cardiosyne elegans, an extinct species from the Triassic of Argentina
 Compsoctenus elegans, a species (Prosterninae) found in Chile
 Conoderus elegans, a species (Agrypninae) with a Palaearctic distribution
 Ctenicera elegans (syn. Corymbites elegans), a species (Prosterninae) found in Canada

Family Cantharidae (soldier beetles)
 Cordylocera elegans

Family Lycidae (net-winged beetles)
 Cautires elegans, a species (Lycinae)

Superfamily Buprestoidea, family Buprestidae (jewel beetles)
 Chalcogenia elegans
 Chrysochroa elegans, the Japanese jewel beetle (tamamushi in Japanese), a species (Chrysochroinae) found in Japan
 Clema elegans

Superfamily Byrrhoidea, family Elmidae (riffle beetles)
 Ctenelmis elegans, a species found near rivers in South Africa

Infraorder Staphyliniformia (staphyliniforms)
Superfamily Staphylinoidea (staphylinoids)
Family Staphylinidae (rove beetles)
 Catalina elegans, a species (Aleocharinae) with an Afrotropical distribution
 Cyrtotyphlus elegans, a species (Leptotyphlinae)
Subfamily Paederinae
 Cephalochetus elegans (syn. Calliderma elegans), a species (Paederini, Echiasterina) found in Sri Lanka
 Cryptobium elegans, a synonym for Ochthephilum elegans, a species (Paederini, Cryptobiina) found in Australia
Subfamily Pselaphinae
 Centrophthalmus elegans, a species (Tyrini) with a Palaearctic distribution
 Chandleria elegans, a species (Metopiasini) found in Panama

Superfamily Hydrophiloidea
Family Hydrophilidae (water scavenger beetles)
 Creniphilus elegans, a synonym for Paracymus elegans, a species (Hydrophilinae) found in southern California

Suborder Adephaga
Superfamily Caraboidea, family Carabidae (ground beetles)

Subfamily Carabinae
 Calosoma elegans (syn. Callisthenes elegans), a species (Carabini) found in Kazakhstan
 Collyris elegans, (syn. Colliuris elegans Vanderl., 1829), a species (Collyridini) found in Java

Subfamily Cicindelinae (tiger beetles)
 Caledonomorpha elegans, a species found in New Guinea
 Cephalota elegans (syn. Cicindela elegans Fourcroy & Geoffroy, 1785), a species (Cicindelini) found in Russia

Subfamily Lebiinae
 Catascopus elegans, a species found in Southeast Asia and Australia
 Colliuris elegans (Guérin-Méneville, 1855), a species (Odacanthini) found in Brazil
 Cymindis elegans, a species found in the United States

Subfamily Licininae
 Callistomimus elegans, a species found in South Africa
 Chlaenius elegans

Subfamily Scaritinae
 Carenum elegans, a species from Western Australia
 Clivina elegans, a species found in Australia

In other ground beetle subfamilies
 Caelostomus elegans, a species (Pterostichinae)
 Cimmerites elegans, a species (Trechinae)
 Colpodes elegans, a species (Platyninae)
 Craspedophorus elegans, a species (Panagaeinae)
 Cypholoba elegans, a synonym for Cypholoba divisa, a species (Anthiinae)

Family Coptoclavidae
 †Coptoclavella elegans, an extinct species from the Cretaceous of Mongolia

Superfamily Dytiscoidea
Family Dytiscidae (diving beetles)
 Colymbetes elegans, a synonym for Copelatus posticatus, a species (Copelatinae)

Order Dermaptera (earwigs)
 Chelisoches elegans, a synonym for Euenkrates elegans, a species (Chelisochidae) found in Sumatra and Java

Order Diptera (flies, mosquitoes, midges and gnats)
Suborder Brachycera (brachyceran flies)

Infraorder Asilomorpha (asilomorphs)
 Calohilara elegans, a synonym for Hilara elegans, a species (Empididae) found in Myanmar
 Cerdistus elegans, a species (Asilidae) found in Tunisia
 Chrysotus elegans, a synonym for Chrysotus longipalpus, a long-legged fly (Dolichopodidae) found worldwide
 Cytherea elegans, a bee fly (Bombyliidae) found in France

Infraorder Muscomorpha (muscomorphs)
Family Syrphidae (hoverflies)
Subfamily Eristalinae
 Chalcosyrphus elegans, a species (Xylotini) found in Myanmar
 Chrysogaster elegans, a synonym for Orthonevra elegans, a species (Brachyopini) found in Europe
Subfamily Syrphinae
 Chrysotoxum elegans, a species (Syrphini) found in southern mainland Europe

Family Chloropidae (frit flies)
 Chloropsina elegans (syn. Chromatopterum elegans), a species (Chloropinae) found in the Philippines
 Conioscinella elegans, a species (Oscinellinae) found in Europe

Other muscomorphs
 Callomyia elegans, a flat-footed fly (Platypezidae) found in Europe
 Cardiacephala elegans, a synonym for Plocoscelus podagricus, a species (Micropezidae) found in Brazil and Peru
 Cecidocharella elegans, a fruit fly (Tephritidae) found in Brazil
 Cestrotus elegans, a species (Lauxaniidae) found in Ethiopia and Morocco
 Chamaemyia elegans, a species (Chamaemyiidae) present in Europe
 Chelisia elegans, a synonym for Anthomyia obscuripennis, a species (Anthomyiidae) found in the United States
 Coenosia elegans, a house fly (Muscidae) found in Alaska
 Conops elegans, a thick-headed fly (Conopidae) found in Cyprus, France and Spain
 Chyliza elegans, a species of rust fly (Psilidae) found in Taiwan
 Cryptomeigenia elegans, a tachinid fly (Tachinidae) found in Mexico
  Cuterebra elegans, a synonym for Cuterebra rufiventris, a rodent bot fly (Oestridae, Cuterebrinae) found in Brazil and Peru

Infraorder Tabanomorpha (tabanomorphs)
Family Rhagionidae (snipe flies)
 Coenura elegans (syn. Caenura elegans), a species found in Chile
 Chrysopilus elegans, a species found from Costa Rica to Peru
Stratiomyidae (soldier flies)
 Cyphomyia elegans, a synonym for Euparyphus elegans, a species (Stratiomyinae, Oxycerini) found in Mexico

Suborder Nematocera (mosquitoes, midges and gnats)
Infrorder Bibionomorpha (bibionomorphs)
 Cecidomyia elegans, a gall midge (Cecidomyiidae) found in Germany
 Corynoptera elegans, a dark-winged fungus gnat (Sciaridae) found in Argentina
Infrorder Tipulomorpha
 Ctenophora elegans, a true crane-fly (Tipulidae) found in Europe
Infraorder Culicomorpha
Family Chironomidae (nonbiting midges)
 Chironomus elegans, a synonym for Eurycnemus crassipes, a species (Orthocladiinae) found in Europe
 Cricotopus elegans, a species (Orthocladiinae) found in Europe
Family Culicidae (mosquitoes)
 Culex elegans, a species (Culicinae), possibly a synonym for Aedes aegypti

Order Hemiptera (true bugs)
Suborder Heteroptera
Infraorder Cimicomorpha
 Cardiastethus elegans, a species (Anthocoridae) with a neotropical distribution
 Coranus elegans, an assassin bug (Reduviidae, Harpactorinae) found in Africa
 Corythucha elegans, the willow lace bug, a lace bug (Tingidae) found on willows in North America
Family Miridae
 Capsodes elegans, a synonym for Capsodes gothicus, a species (Mirinae) found in Europe
 †Closterocoris elegans, an extinct species (Mirinae) found in the Eocene Florissant Formation of Colorado
 Compsocerocoris elegans, a species found in Central America

Infraorder Nepomorpha (true water bugs)
 †Corixa elegans, an extinct species (Corixidae) from the Oligocene of Germany

Infraorder Pentatomomorpha
Superfamily Pentatomoidea (shield bugs)
Family Pentatomidae (stink bugs), subfamily Pentatominae
 Cephaloplatus elegans, a species (Carpocorini) found in the Northern Territory, Australia
 Commius elegans (syn. Cimex elegans), a species (Diemeniini) found in Australia
 Cyptocephala elegans, a species (Pentatomini) found in Illinois
Family Plataspidae
 Coptosoma elegans, a species (Platasdinae) found in Europe

Superfamily Coreoidea
 Cercinthus elegans (syn. Coreus elegans), a species (Coreidae) found in the Canary Islands

Superfamily Lygaeoidea
 Carvalhodrymus elegans, a species (Rhyparochromidae) found in Ghana and Cameroon
 Cymus elegans, a species (Lygaeidae) found in Korea

Suborder Auchenorrhyncha
Superfamily Fulgoroidea (fulgoroids)
 Calyptoproctus elegans, a lanternfly (Fulgoridae) found in Suriname, Brazil, French Guiana and Honduras
 Cromna elegans, a synonym for Siphanta acuta, the green planthopper or the torpedo bug, a species (Flatidae)

Infraorder Cicadomorpha, superfamily Membracoidea
 Callistrophia elegans , a synonym for Taurotettix elegans, a hopper (Cicadellidae, Deltocephalinae, Cicadulini) found in Asia

Suborder Sternorrhyncha (aphids, whiteflies and scale insects)
Superfamily Aphidoidea (aphids or plant lice)
 Callipterus elegans, a synonym for Tinocallis platani, a species (Aphididae, Calaphidinae) found in Europe and North America
Superfamily Psylloidea
 Cacopsylla elegans, a species (Psyllidae) found in Japan
 Colposcenia elegans, a species (Aphalaridae, Aphalarinae) with a Palaearctic distribution in northern and eastern Africa and the Middle East

Order Hymenoptera (ants, bees, wasps and sawflies)
Suborder Apocrita (ants, bees and wasps)
Superfamily Vespoidea
Family Pompilidae (spider wasps)
 Ceropales elegans, a species (Ceropalinae) found in Texas
 Cryptocheilus elegans, a species (Pepsinae) found in Europe

Family Formicidae (ants)
 Camponotus elegans, a carpenter ant (Formicinae) found in south east Queensland and Western Australia
 Cardiocondyla elegans, a species (Myrmicinae) found in the Mediterranean region
 Cerapachys elegans, a species (Dorylinae) found in Australia
 Conomyrma elegans, a synonym for Dorymyrmex elegans, a species (Dolichoderinae) endemic to the United States and Mexico
 Crematogaster elegans, a species (Myrmicinae) found on the Aru and Kai islands, Indonesia

Superfamily Apoidea
Clade Anthophila (bees)
Family Apidae
 Centris elegans, a species (Apinae) found on Saint Vincent and Grenadines
 Crocisa elegans, a synonym for Thyreus elegans, a species (Apinae) found in Eurasia and Africa

Family Colletidae (plasterer bees)
 Caupolicana elegans a species found in Mexico and the United States
 Colletes elegans, a ground-nesting species found in Israel
Family Crabronidae
 Cerceris elegans, a species found in Russia

Superfamily Ichneumonoidea
Family Braconidae (braconid wasps)
 Calaphidius elegans, a parasitoid species (Aphidiinae) found in Europe
 Chelonus elegans, a species (Cheloninae)
 Chrysopophthorus elegans, a synonym for Chrysopophthorus hungaricus, a parasitoid species (Euphorinae) found in northern Italy and introduced in Great Britain
 Coelinidea elegans (syn. Chaenon elegans or Coelinius elegans), a species of parasitoid wasps (Alysiinae) found in Europe
Subfamily Braconinae
 Callibracon elegans, a species (Braconini)
 Campyloneurus elegans, a species (Braconini) found in Cameroon

Family Ichneumonidae
 Campodorus elegans, a parasitic wasp (Ctenopelmatinae, Mesoleiini) found in England
 Cryptanuridimorpha elegans, a synonym for Polycyrtus vierecki, a species (Gelinae, Cryptini) found in Peru
Subfamily Campopleginae, tribe Limneriini
 Campoplex elegans, a synonym for Dusona elegans, a parasitic wasp found in Tanzania
 Cymodusa elegans , a synonym for Nemeritis elegans, a parasitic wasp found in Europe

Superfamily Platygastroidea
 Calliscelio elegans (syn. Caloteleia elegans), a parasitoid wasp (Platygastridae) found on the Hawaiian island of Oʻahu

Superfamily Chalcidoidea (chalcid wasps)
 Cerachalcis elegans or Cratocentrus elegans, synonyms for Cratocentrus ruficornis, a species (Chalcididae) found in Namibia, South Africa and Zimbabwe
 Chaetospila elegans or Choetospila elegans, synonyms for Theocolax elegans, a parasitic wasp (Pteromalidae) of immature stages of stored grain pest insects
 Cheiloneurus elegans (syn. Cleonymus elegans), a parasitic wasp (Encyrtidae)
 Chrysolampus elegans, a species (Perilampidae) with a Nearctic distribution
 Cosmocoma elegans, a synonym for Polynema howardii, a species of fairyflies or fairy wasps (Mymaridae) with a Nearctic distribution

Superfamily Chrysidoidea
Family Chrysididae (cuckoo wasps)
 Chrysis elegans, a species (Chrysidinae) found in southern Europe
 Cleptes elegans, a synonym for Cleptes semicyaneus, a species (Cleptinae) found in Europe

Order Lepidoptera (butterflies and moths)
Suborder Rhopalocera (butterflies)
Superfamily Papilionoidea
Family Lycaenidae (gossamer-winged butterflies)
 Catapaecilma elegans, the common tinsel, a species found in Asia
Family Nymphalidae (brush-footed butterflies)
 Clossiana elegans, a synonym for Boloria improba improbula
 Cyrestis elegans, a synonym for Cyrestis camillus elegans, a species (Cyrestinae) known from Madagascar
Family Pieridae
 Colias elegans, a synonym for Colias phicomone, the mountain clouded yellow, a species (Coliadinae) found in the Cantabrian Mountains, the Pyrenees, the Carpathian Mountains and the Alps

Superfamily Hesperioidea
Family Hesperiidae (skipper butterflies)
 Callimormus elegans, a synonym for Callimormus radiola elegans, a subspecies of the radiant skipper (Hesperiinae) found in southern Mexico, Ecuador, Brazil, Colombia and Argentina
 Chapra elegans, a species
 Cobalopsis elegans, a species (Hesperiinae) found in Ecuador

Division Ditrysia
Superfamily Pyraloidea (pyraloid moths)
Family Pyralidae (snout moths)
 Cacozelia elegans, a species found in Venezuela
Family Crambidae (grass moths)
 Circobotys elegans, a species found in Taiwan
 Crambus elegans, a synonym for Microcrambus elegans, the elegant grass-veneer moth, a species (Crambinae) found in North America
 Cryptographis elegans, a species (Pyraustinae) found in Puerto Rico

Superfamily Gelechioidea (curved-horn moths)
 Cacogamia elegans, a synonym for Tisis elegans, a species (Lecithoceridae) found on Java
 Coleophora elegans, a species (Coleophoridae) found in Africa

Superfamily Zygaenoidea
Family Limacodidae (slug moths)
 Casphalia elegans, a species found in Ghana
 Compsopsectra elegans, a species found in the Philippines
 Cyrtosia elegans, a synonym for Packardia elegans, the elegant tailed slug moth, a species (Limacodinae) found in Canada and the United States

Superfamily Lasiocampoidea
 Catalebeda elegans, an eggar (Lasiocampidae) found in Africa

Section Cossina
Subsection Cossina
Superfamily Cossoidea
Family Cossidae (carpenter millers)
  Callocossus elegans, a synonym for Eulophonotus elegans, a species (Zeuzerinae) found in Sierra Leone, Cameroon, the Republic of the Congo, Equatorial Guinea and Tanzania
 Costria elegans, a species (Cossinae) found in South America
Superfamily Tortricoidea, family Tortricidae (tortrix moths)
 Cochylimorpha elegans, a species (Tortricinae) found in Iran

Subsection Bombycina
Superfamily Bombycoidea (bombycoid moths)
Family Sphingidae (hawk moths)
 Callionima elegans, a synonym for Callionima grisescens, a species (Macroglossinae)
 Chaerocampa elegans, a synonym for Hippotion echeclus, a species (Macroglossinae) found in Southeast Asia

Superfamily Geometroidea
Family Geometridae (geometer moths)
Subfamily Ennominae
 Callhistia elegans, a species (Boarmiini)
 Cleora elegans, a synonym for Cleora leucophaea, a species found in Russia, Taiwan, Japan and South Korea
 Colpocraspeda elegans, a species found in Papua New Guinea
Subfamily Larentiinae
 Coenocalpe elegans, a species (Melanthiini) found in North America

Superfamily Noctuoidea
Family Noctuidae (owlet moths)
 Chersotis elegans, a species found in the mountains of Spain, Greece, Turkey, the Caucasus and Lebanon
 Chytonix elegans, a species from Costa Rica
 Conistra elegans, a species
 Cosmodes elegans, the green-blotched moth, a species found in Australia and New Zealand
Family Erebidae
Subfamily Arctiinae (tiger moths)
 Correbia elegans a species (Euchromiina) found in Panama
 Correbidia elegans, a species found in Mexico and Panama
 Cosmosoma elegans, a species found in Brazil
Subfamily Lymantriinae
 Calliteara elegans, a synonym for Mpanjaka elegans, a species (Lymantrini) found in Madagascar

Family Nolidae (tuft moths)
 Cacyparis elegans, a species found in the Solomon Islands

Order Mantodea (mantises)
 Caliris elegans, a species found in Malaysia, Sumatra and Borneo
 Calofulcinia elegans, a species found in New Guinea

Order Neuroptera (net-winged insects)
Family Ascalaphidae (owlflies)
 Cordulecerus elegans, a species found in South America

Family Chrysopidae (green lacewings)
 Ceraeochrysa elegans, a species found in Costa Rica
 Chrysopidia elegans, a species found in China and Nepal

Family Myrmeleontidae (antlions)
 Creoleon elegans, a species (Myrmeleontinae) found in Iran

Order Odonata (dragonflies and damselflies)
Suborder Epiprocta
 †Campterophlebia elegans, an extinct species (†Campterophlebiidae) from the Jurassic of Germany

Suborder Zygoptera (damselflies)
 Chlorolestes elegans, a sylph (Synlestidae) found in Botswana, Malawi, Mozambique, South Africa and Zimbabwe
 Calopteryx elegans, a synonym for Calopteryx angustipennis, the Appalachian jewelwing, a species (Calopterygidae) endemic to the United States

Order Orthoptera (crickets and grasshoppers)
Suborder Caelifera (grasshoppers)
Family Acrididae
 Cyphocerastis elegans, a species found in Africa
Subfamily Acridinae
 Calephorus elegans, a synonym for Calephorus compressicornis, French name: Criquet des dunes, a species found in France, Spain and Africa
Subfamily Oxyinae
 Caryanda elegans (Bolívar, 1911), a synonym for Caryanda modesta, a species
 Caryanda elegans Bolívar, 1918, a synonym for Caryanda neoelegans, a species
Subfamily Catantopinae (spur-throated grasshoppers)
 Catantops elegans or Cryptocatantops elegans, synonyms for Cryptocatantops debilis, a species (Catantopini) found in Namibia
 Chitaura elegans, a species found in Indo-Malaysia
Subfamily Gomphocerinae (slant-faced grasshoppers)
 Clinocephalus elegans, a synonym for Dichromorpha elegans, the short-winged grasshopper
Subfamily Oedipodinae
 Chortoicetes elegans, a synonym for Chortoicetes terminifera, the Australian plague locust
Family Pyrgomorphidae (gaudy grasshoppers)
 Chlorizeina elegans, a synonym for Chlorizeina unicolor unicolor, a species found in Asia
Subfamily Eyprepocnemidinae
 Cataloipus elegans, a synonym for Cataloipus cognatus, a species found in Asia (India, Pakistan) and Africa (Mozambique, Zimbabwe, South Africa)

Family Euschmidtiidae
 Chloromastax elegans, a synonym for Apteropeoedes elegans, a species (Pseudoschmidtiinae) found in Madagascar

Suborder Ensifera
 Ceuthophilus elegans, a cave cricket (Rhaphidophoridae) found in the United States
Family Tettigoniidae (long-horned grasshoppers)
 Clonia elegans, a synonym for Clonia melanoptera, the giant black-winged clonia, a predatory katydid (Saginae) found in South Africa
 Coptaspis elegans, a species (Conocephalinae)

Order Phthiraptera (lice)
 Campanulotes elegans, a species parasite on the brush bronzewing, a bird in the pigeon family endemic to Australia

Order Psocoptera (booklice and barklice)
Suborder Troctomorpha
 Compsocus elegans, a species (Compsocidae) found in Central America
Suborder Psocomorpha
 Caecilius elegans, a synonym for Valenzuela elegans, a species of lizard barklice (Caeciliusidae) found in Haiti and the Hispaniola island
 Colpostigma elegans, a synonym for Thyrsopsocus elegans, a species (Psocidae) found in Brazil

Order Trichoptera (caddisflies)
 †Cretapsyche elegans, an extinct species (Dysoneuridae) from the Late Cretaceous of Myanmar

Hexapods, class Entognatha

Order Collembola
 Cryptopygus elegans, a slender springtail (Entomobryidae) found in Argentina

Arthropods, subphylum Crustacea (crustaceans), class Branchiopoda (branchiopods)

Order Spinicaudata (spinicaudatans)
 †Congestheriella elegans, an extinct species of branchiopods (†Afrograptidae) from the Upper Jurassic

Arthropods, crustaceans, class Maxillopoda (maxillopodans), subclass Copepoda (copepods)

Order Calanoida (calanoids)
 Calanus elegans, a synonym for Calanus finmarchicus, a species (Calanidae) part of zooplankton found in enormous amounts in the northern Atlantic Ocean
 Calocalanus elegans, a marine species (Calocalanidae) found in the Canaries, Indian Ocean, Mediterranean Sea, Red Sea and sub-Antarctic waters
 Centropages elegans, a marine species (Centropagidae)

Order Cyclopoida (cyclopoids)
 Cyclopinodes elegans (syn. Cyclopina elegans or Cyclopinoides elegans), a marine species (Cyclopinidae) found in Scotland
 Cyclops elegans, a freshwater species (Cyclopidae)

Order Siphonostomatoida
 Caligus elegans or Caligulus elegans, synonyms for Caligus curtus, a sea louse (Caligidae) parasite of the Atlantic cod
 Collocheres elegans, a species (Asterocheridae) found in the British Isles and western Norway infesting the black brittle star

Arthropods, crustaceans, class Malacostraca (malacostracans)

Order Isopoda (isopods)
 Cancricepon elegans (syn. Cepon elegans), a species that parasitises the crab Pilumnus hirtellus from French and Great Britain's waters
 Clianella elegans, a synonym for Dynoides elegans, a species found in California
 Cymothoa elegans, a parasitic species found in the Java Sea

Order Cumacea (cumaceans)
 Chalarostylis elegans
 Cyclaspis elegans

Order Decapoda (decapods)
 Calcinus elegans, the elegant hermit, a hermit crab (Diogenidae) found in the Indo-West Pacific region
 †Callianassa elegans, an extinct species (Callianassidae) from Java
 Choniognathus elegans, a crab (Majidae) found in South Africa
 Cuapetes elegans, a shrimp (Palaemonidae)

Order Amphipoda (amphipods)
 Caprellinoides elegans

Arthropods, crustaceans, class Ostracoda (ostracods)

Order Halocyprida
 Conchoecia elegans, a synonym for Discoconchoecia elegans, a species (Halocypridae) found in Norway

Order †Palaeocopida
 †Cystomatochilina elegans, an extinct species (†Eurychilinidae) from the Silurian of central Bohemia, Czech Republic

Order Podocopida
Family Cytheridae
 †Cytherideis elegans, an extinct species from the Quaternary of Sicily

Family Cyprididae
 Chlamydotheca elegans, a freshwater species (Cypridinae) found in Colombia
 Cypricercus elegans, a freshwater species (Cypricercinae) found in Colombia

Family Leptocytheridae
 Callistocythere elegans (syn. Cythere elegans), a species from the Gulf of Naples, Italy

Arthropods, unranked Arachnomorpha (arachnomorphs), subphylum Chelicerata (chelicerates), class Arachnida (arachnids)

Order Araneae (spiders)
Infraorder Mygalomorphae (mygalomorphs)
Family Dipluridae (funnel-web tarantulas)
 Caledothele elegans, a species found in New Caledonia
 Cethegus elegans, a species found in Queensland
Family Theraphosidae (tarantulas)
 Cyriocosmus elegans, a species found in Venezuela, Trinidad and Tobago

Infraorder Araneomorphae (araneomorphs)
Family Eutichuridae
 Cheiracanthium elegans, a species found in Europe and Central Asia
Family Gnaphosidae (ground spiders)
 Camillina elegans, a species found in the Caribbean, in Angola and in the Pacific Islands
 Cesonia elegans, a species found on St. Vincent, Dominica
Family Linyphiidae (sheet weavers)
 Cnephalocotes elegans, a synonym for Silometopus elegans, a species found in Europe
Family Salticidae (jumping spiders)
 Chalcoscirtus elegans, a synonym for Rogmocrypta elegans a species (Hisponinae) found in New Caledonia and the Philippines
 Cyrene elegans, a synonym for Phiale elegans, a species found in Panama
Family Stiphidiidae (sheetweb spiders)
 Cambridgea elegans, a species found in New Zealand
Family Tetragnathidae (long-jawed orb weavers)
 Callinethis elegans, a synonym for Opadometa fastigata, the pear-shaped leucauge, a species (Leucauginae) found in India to the Philippines and Sulawesi
Family Theridiidae
 Chrysso elegans, a synonym for Chrysso albomaculata, a species found in the United States, the West Indies to Brazil

Order Pseudoscorpiones (pseudoscorpions)
Superfamily Cheliferoidea, family Chernetidae
 Chelifer elegans, a synonym for Mesochernes elegans, a species found in Venezuela
 Chrysochernes elegans, a species found in New Mexico, United States
Superfamily Cheiridioidea
 Cryptocheiridium elegans (syn. Cubanocheiridium elegans), a species (Cheiridiidae) found in Cuba
Superfamily Chthonioidea
 Cryptoditha elegans, a species (Tridenchthoniidae) found in Brazil
Superfamily Garypoidea
 Calocheiridius elegans, a species (Olpiidae) found in India

Order Opiliones (harvestmen)
 Caelopygus elegans, a species found in Brazil
 Carinostoma elegans, a species found in Hungary
 Cereatta elegans, a species found in Cameroon

Order Scorpiones (scorpions)
 Centruroides elegans (syn. Centrurus elegans), a species (Buthidae) found in Mexico
 †Compsoscorpius elegans, an extinct species from the Carboniferous of France and the United Kingdom

Arthropods, Arachnomorpha, chelicerates, arachnids, subclass Acari (mites)

Order Trombidiformes
 Colopalpus elegans, a synonym for Tenuipalpus elegans, a flat mite (Tenuipalpidae)
 Cubanohydracarus elegans, a species (Hungarohydracaridae) found in Cuba

Arthropods, unranked Arachnomorpha (arachnomorphs), subphylum †Trilobitomorpha, class †Trilobita (trilobites)

Order †Agnostida
 †Cyclagnostus elegans, a synonym for Acmarhachis elegans, an extinct species (†Agnostidae) from the Upper Cambrian of the USSR

Order †Asaphida
 †Costonia elegans, a species (†Trinucleidae) from the Ordovician of South Shropshire, England

Order †Phacopita
 †Coronocephalus elegans, an extinct species (†Encrinuridae) from the Silurian of China

Order †Ptychopariida
 †Conocephalites elegans, a synonym for †Bailiaspis elegans, an extinct species (†Conocoryphidae) from the Cambrian

Arthropods, subphylum Myriapoda (myriapods), class Chilopoda (centipedes)

Order Scolopendromorpha
 Cormocephalus elegans, a species (Scolopendridae) found in North Africa

Superphylum Lophotrochozoa, phylum Mollusca (molluscs)

Class Gastropoda (gastropods)

Clade Caenogastropoda
Superfamily †Paleostyloidea
 †Cheilotomona elegans, an extinct marine species (†Goniasmatidae) from the Triassic of Guizhou Province, China

Clade Architaenioglossa, superfamily Cyclophoroidea
 †Craspedopoma elegans, an extinct species (Craspedopomatidae or Maizaniidae) from the Miocene of Germany
 Cyclophorus elegans, a species (Cyclophoridae) found in China
 Cochlostoma elegans, a land snail (Cochlostomatidae) found on the island of Pag in Croatia

Clade Hypsogastropoda
Clade Littorinimorpha
 Capulus elegans (syn. Capula elegans), a sea snail (Capulidae)
 Constantia elegans, a sea snail (Vanikoridae) found in Japan
 Cyclostoma elegans, a synonym for Pomatias elegans, the round-mouthed snail, a land snail (Pomatiidae) common in southern Europe
 Cyclostrema elegans, a synonym for Adeorbis elegans, a sea snail (Tornidae)
 †Cypraedia elegans (syn. Cypraea elegans or Cypraeovula elegans), a sea snail (Pediculariidae) from the Eocene Europe

Superfamily Naticoidea
 Choristes elegans, a synonym for Amauropsis islandica, the Iceland moonsnail, a predatory sea snail (Naticidae)
Superfamily Rissooidea
 Caecum elegans, a synonym for Caecum trachea, a minute sea snail (Caecidae) found on rocky shores in European waters
 Cingula elegans, a synonym for Peringiella elegans, a species (Rissoidae)
Superfamily Stromboidea
 †Chenopus elegans, a synonym for †Digitolabrum elegans, an extinct species (Aporrhaidae) from the Eocene of Egypt

Clade Neogastropoda
 Cancellaria elegans, a synonym for Merica elegans, the elegant nutmeg, a sea snail (Cancellariidae) found off the Philippines, Indonesia, western Thailand and Queensland
 Coronium elegans, a sea snail (Muricidae) found off the southeastern coast of Brazil
 Cryptospira elegans, a sea snail (Marginellidae) found in Asia

Superfamily Buccinoidea
 Cantharus elegans, a true whelk (Buccinidae) found in Panama and Mexico
 Columbella elegans, a synonym for Cotonopsis turrita, a sea snail (Columbellidae) found in western America

Clade Neogastropoda, superfamily Conoidea
 Cochlespira elegans, a sea snail (Cochlespiridae) found in the Caribbean Sea, the Gulf of Mexico and the Greater Antilles
 Comitas elegans, a sea snail (Turridae)

Family Conidae
 Conasprella elegans (syn. Conus elegans G. B. Sowerby III, 1895), a sea snail found from Somalia to Pakistan and off Western Australia
 Conus elegans Schepman, 1913, a synonym for Conasprella comatosa, a sea snail found in the Pacific Ocean off Japan, the Philippines, northwest Australia, New Caledonia and the Solomon Islands
Family Drilliidae
 Cerodrillia elegans, a sea snail found off Espírito Santo, Brazil

Informal group Ptenoglossa, superfamily Triphoroidea
 Cerithiopsida elegans (syn. Cerithiopsis elegans), a sea snail (Newtoniellidae) found in the Kuril Islands
Clade Sorbeoconcha, superfamily Cerithioidea
 Cerithium elegans, a fossil sea snail (Cerithiidae)

Clade Heterobranchia, clade Euthyneura
 Caloria elegans, a colorful sea slug (Facelinidae) found in European waters
 Chilina elegans, an air-breathing freshwater snail (Chilinidae) found in Chile
 Chromodoris elegans, a synonym for Felimare picta, a sea slug (Chromodorididae) found throughout the Mediterranean Sea and the eastern North Atlantic Ocean
 Chrysallida elegans, a synonym for Liamorpha elegans, a sea snail (Pyramidellidae) found in the European waters
 Coenocharopa elegans, the elegant pinwheel snail, an air-breathing land snail (Charopidae) found in Queensland, Australia

Informal group Opisthobranchia
 Cyerce elegans, a sacoglossan sea slug (Caliphyllidae)

Clade Euopisthobranchia, clade Cephalaspidea
Superfamily Philinoidea
 Chelidonura elegans, a synonym for Chelidonura hirundinina, a sea slug (Aglajidae) found in the western Indo-Pacific and the Caribbean Sea
Clade Panpulmonata, clade Eupulmonata, clade Stylommatophora
Informal group Sigmurethra
Superfamily Clausilioidea
 Columbinia elegans, an air-breathing land snail (Clausiliidae) found in Peru
Superfamily Punctoidea
 †Calogoniodiscus elegans, an extinct species (Discidae) from the Tertiary

Clade Vetigastropoda
 Choristes elegans var. tenera, a synonym for Choristella tenera, a sea snail (Lepetellidae) found in the Atlantic Ocean off New Jersey and North Carolina, United States

Superfamily Seguenzioidea
 †Calliomphalus elegans, an extinct species (Calliotropidae) from the Cretaceous of Siberia

Superfamly Trochoidea
 Calliostoma elegans, a synonym for Laetifautor elegans, a sea snail (Calliostomatidae) found in Japan
 Chunula elegans, a synonym for Liotella elegans, a marine species (Skeneidae) found off the Northern Territory, Australia

Class Bivalvia (bivalves)
Subclass Pteriomorphia

Order Arcoida
 †Cucullaea elegans, an extinct species of false ark shells (Cucullaeidae) from the north of Germany

Order Mytiloida
 †Crenella elegans, an extinct species (Mytilidae) from the Lutecian of France

Order Ostreoida
 †Crassostrea elegans (syn. †Cubitostrea elegans), an extinct species of true oysters (Ostreidae)

Order Pterioida
 Crenatula elegans, a synonym for Crenatula picta, a marine species (Pteriidae) known from Madagascar and the Red Sea

Subclass Heterodonta

Order Myoida
Family Corbulidae
 †Caestocorbula elegans, an extinct saltwater clam from the Eocene of Belgium
 †Corbulamella elegans (syn. Corbula elegans), an extinct clam from the Cretaceous of France

Order Carditoida
 †Carbonicola elegans, an extinct species of saltwater clams (Anthracosiidae) that lived during the Carboniferous period of the United Kingdom
 Chama elegans, Centrocardita elegans or Cardita elegans (Requien, 1848), synonyms for Centrocardita aculeata, a marine clam (Carditidae) found in the Mediterranean Sea and the European part of the North Atlantic Ocean
 †Cyclocardia elegans (syn. Cardita elegans (Lamarck, 1806)), an extinct clam (Carditidae) from the Eocene of France

Order Veneroida (veneroids)
 †Callista elegans, an extinct clam (Veneridae) from the Eocene of France
 Callocardia elegans, a synonym for Dosinia concentrica, the West Indian dosinia, a species of saltwater clam (Veneridae) found in Caribbean waters
 †Corbicula elegans, an extinct species of fresh and brackish water clams (Cyrenidae)
 Cumingia elegans, a synonym for Thyellisca lamellosa, a marine clam (Semelidae)
 †Cypricardinia elegans, an extinct species (Cardiniidae) from the Devonian of Maryland, United States
Superfamily Lucinoidea
 †Cavilucina elegans Fischer, 1887, an extinct species (Lucinidae) from the Lutetian of France
 Cavilucina elegans (Deshayes, 1823) or Corbis elegans, a synonym for Fimbria soverbii, a species (Fimbriidae)
Suborder Sphaeriacea
 Cyclas elegans, a synonym for Sphaerium rhomboideum, the rhomboid fingernailclam, a freshwater species (Sphaeriidae) found in North America

Order Pholadomyoida
 Cetoconcha elegans (syn. Cribrosoconcha elegans), a saltwater clam (Poromyidae)
 †Clavagella elegans, an extinct marine species (Clavagellidae) from the Cretaceous of Algeria
 Cuspidaria elegans, a species (Cuspidariidae) found in Indonesia, the Philippines and the South China Sea

Class Cephalopoda (cephalopods), subclass †Ammonoidea (ammonites)
 †Crendonites elegans, a species from the Upper Jurassic of Greenland

Order †Ammonitida
 †Cleviceras elegans, an extinct species (Hildoceratidae) from the Early Jurassic of Europe, Siberia and Canada
 †Crioceras elegans (probable synonym of †Crioceratites elegans), an extinct species (Crioceratitidae) from the Cretaceous of Germany
 †Crioceratites elegans, an extinct species (Crioceratitidae) from the Early Cretaceous

Order †Ceratitida (ceratitids)
 †Ceccaisculitoides elegans, an extinct species (Paragoceratidae) from the Triassic of Nevada
 †Paraceratites elegans (synonym †Ceratites elegans), an extinct species from the Triassic of China and Israel

Order †Goniatitida
 †Cancelloceras elegans, an extinct species (Gastrioceratidae) from the Carboniferous of the Russian Federation, Navada (United States) and Uzbekistan

Subclass Nautiloidea (nautiloids)

Order Nautilida
 †Cymatoceras elegans, a species (Cymatoceratidae) from the Cretaceous of Switzerland and the United Kingdom

Class Aplacophora

Order Chaetodermatida
 Chaetoderma elegans, a glisten worm (Chaetodermatidae) found in the eastern Pacific

Class Scaphopoda (scaphopods)

Order Gadilida
 Costentalina elegans, a species (Entalinidae) found in Australia and the Indian Ocean

Class Polyplacophora (chitons)

Order Chitonida
 Craspedochiton elegans (syn. Craspedoplax elegans), a species (Acanthochitonidae)

Mollusca incertae sedis (gastropods or monoplacophorans)

Not yet assigned to an order, superfamily †Bellerophontoidea
 †Conradella elegans or †Cyrtolites elegans, synonyms for †Phragmolites elegans, an extinct species (†Bucaniidae) from the Ordovician of Ohio

Lophotrochozoa, phylum Bryozoa (bryozoans)

Class Gymnolaemata

Order Cheilostomata
 Carbasea elegans, a species (Flustridae) found in Australia
 Catenicella elegans, a species (Catenicellidae) found in New Zealand
 Characodoma elegans, a species (Cleidochasmatidae) found in the South China Sea
 †Coscinopleura elegans, an extinct species (Coscinopleuridae) from the Paleocene of Denmark
 Cupuladria elegans, a species (Cupuladriidae) from the Nansha Islands sea area

Class Stenolaemata

Order Cyclostomatida
 Cinctipora elegans, a species (Cinctiporidae) found in New Zealand
 Crisia elegans, a species (Crisiidae) from Cape of Good Hope in South Africa
 †Cyrtopora elegans, an extinct marine species from the Cretaceous of Europe

Order †Cystoporida
 †Coscinium elegans, an extinct species (†Hexagonellidae) from the Paleozoic rocks of the western states and territories of the United States
 †Cystodictya elegans, an extinct species (†Cystodictyonidae) from the Upper Carboniferous of Oklahoma, United States

Order Rhabdomesida
 †Clausotrypa elegans, an extinct species (Nikiforovellidae) from the Permian of northeast China

Order †Trepostomatida
 †Callocladia elegans, an extinct species (†Crustoporidae) from the Devonian or Carboniferous of the Park City Formation in Idaho, Wyoming and Utah

Lophotrochozoa, phylum Brachiopoda (brachiopods)

Class Craniata, order Craniopsida
 †Craniops elegans, an extinct species (Craniopsidae) from the Ordovician of Estonia

Class Rhynchonellata

Order Athyridida
 †Cleiothyridina elegans, an extinct species (Athyrididae) from the Mississippian of Oklahoma

Order Rhynchonellida
 †Camarotoechia elegans, an extinct species (†Trigonirhynchiidae) from the Ordovician and Silurian of the Siberian platform
 †Caucasorhynchia elegans, an extinct species (Allorhynchidae) known from the Triassic of Slovakia
 †Cyclothyris elegans, an extinct species (†Cyclothyrididae) from the Mastrichian (Upper Cretaceous) of Belgium

Order Terebratulida
 †Cubanothyris elegans, an extinct species (†Angustothyrididae) from the Triassic of Russian Federation

Class †Strophomenata

Order †Strophomenida
 †Chonetes elegans L.B. Smyth 1922, a synonym for †Chonetes speciosus, an extinct species (†Chonetidae) found in Ireland
 †Crinistrophia elegans, a synonym for †Douvillinella (Crinistrophia) elegans, an extinct species (†Douvillinidae) from the Devonian of the Czech Republic and Germany

Order †Productida
 †Chonetes elegans L. G. de Koninck, 1847, a synonym for †Plicochonetes elegans, an extinct species (†Rugosochonetidae)

Lophotrochozoa, phylum Nemertea (nemertean worms)

Class Enopla

Order Hoplonemertea
 Cyanonemertes elegans, a marine species from Washington state, United States

Lophotrochozoa, phylum Annelida (annelids)

Class Polychaeta (polychaete worms)

Order Phyllodocida
 Chrysopetalum elegans, a synonym for Bhawania goodei, a species (Chrysopetalidae) found in tropical waters around the world

Order Canalipalpata
 Corephorus elegans, a synonym for Terebellides stroemii, a species (Terebellidae)

Superphylum Platyzoa

Phylum Rotifera (rotifers), class Eurotifera

Order Ploima
 Cephalodella elegans, a species (Notommatidae) found on Mount Desert Island, in Hancock County, Maine, United States

Order Bdelloidea
 Callidina elegans, the graceful callidina, a freshwater species (Adinetidae)

Platyzoa, phylum Platyhelminthes (flatworms)

Class Monogenea

Order Dactylogyridea
 Calceostoma elegans, a synonym for Calceostoma calceostoma, a species (Calceostomatidae) parasite of the brown meagre (Sciaena umbra) in the Mediterranean

Class Rhabditophora

Order Rhabdocoela
 Cicerina elegans, a species (Cicerinidae) from the bay of Great Peter of the Sea of Japan

Class Trematoda (trematodes)
Cercarial forms
Cercaria can be used as a genus to specify the larval form of a species. Cercaria elegans may refer to such species as Bucephalus elegans or Plagiorchis elegans or Transversotrema elegans
 Cercaria elegans (Hong Kong larval trematode) Tang, 1992 nec Mueller in La Valette, 1855, the cercarial form of a species of trematodes parasite of marine bivalves in Hong Kong, listed at Cercaria (genus)

Order Plagiorchiida
 Choanocotyle elegans, a species (Choanocotylidae) that infects Australian freshwater turtles

Class Turbellaria

Order Prolecithophosra
 Cylindrostoma elegans, a synonym for Pseudostomum klostermanni, a marine species (Pseudostomidae) found in the Black and Mediterranean seas and in the European waters of the North Atlantic Ocean

Platyzoa, phylum Gastrotricha (gastrotrichs)

Order Chaetonotida

 Chaetonotus elegans, a species (Chaetonotidae) found in freshwaters of Europe

Animals incertae sedis

Class Chitinozoa (chitinozoans)

Order Prosomatifera

 †Conochitina elegans, an extinct species (Conochitinidae) of the Silurian of the Baltic Sea

Eukaryotes, unikonts, opisthokonts, kingdom Fungi

Subkingdom Dikarya (higher fungi), phylum Ascomycota (ascomycetes or sac fungi)

Subphylum Pezizomycotina

Class Arthoniomycetes

Order Arthoniales
 Coniocarpon elegans, a synonym for Arthonia elegans, a lichen (Arthoniaceae)

Class Dothideomycetes

Order Capnodiales
 Capnodium elegans, a synonym for Acrogenotheca elegans, a species (Capnodiaceae) found in Australia and New Zealand
 Cladosporium elegans, a plant pathogen (Davidiellaceae) found on leaves of oranges in Italy

Order Microthyriales
 Chaetothyriothecium elegans, a species (Microthyriaceae) found in central Thailand

Order Pleosporales
 Campsotrichum elegans, a synonym for Periconia elegans, a species (incertae sedis)
 Cheiromoniliophora elegans, a species (incertae sedis)

Class Laboulbeniomycetes

Order Laboulbeniales
Family Laboulbeniaceae
 Chitonomyces elegans, a species
 Corethromyces elegans, a species found on Rhexius inculptus (ant-loving beetles) in the United States
 Cryptandromyces elegans, a species found in the Netherlands
 Cucujomyces elegans, a species found in Argentina

Class Lecanoromycetes

Order Teloschistales
 Caloplaca elegans or Callopisma elegans, synonyms for Xanthoria elegans, a species of lichenized fungi (Teloschistaceae) with a circumpolar and alpine distribution

Order Lecanorales
 Cenomyce elegans, a species of lychenized fungi (Cladoniaceae)

Order Acarosporales
 Chiliospora elegans, a synonym for Myriospora elegans, a species of lichenized fungi (Acarosporaceae)

Order Peltigerales
 Coccocarpia elegans, a species of lichenized fungi (Coccocarpiaceae) found in Brazil

Class Leotiomycetes

Order Helotiales
 Cornularia elegans, a species (Dermateaceae) found in Italy

Class Orbiliomycetes

Order Orbiliales
 Candelabrella elegans, a synonym for Arthrobotrys elegans, a species (Orbiliaceae) found on dung

Class Sordariomycetes
 Canalisporium elegans, a lignicolous species (incertae sedis) found in Malaysia

Order Chaetosphaeriales
 Chaetosphaeria elegans, a species (Chaetosphaeriaceae)

Order Diaporthales
 Cytospora elegans, a species (Valsaceae)

Order Microascales
 Ceratopodium elegans, a species (Microascaceae)
 Chalara elegans, a synonym for Thielaviopsis basicola, a plant pathogen (Ceratocystidaceae)

Order Hypocreales
Family Hypocreaceae
 Cladobotryum elegans, a species

Family Nectriaceae
 Cephalodiplosporium elegans, a species
 Corallomycetella elegans (syn. Corallomyces elegans), a parasite of the rubber, tea and cacao trees
 Cylindrocladiella elegans, a species

Ascomycota incertae sedis
 Catenospegazzinia elegans, a species found in Western Australia
 Cephalosporium elegans, a synonym for Botryosporium pulchrum, a plant pathogen that causes leaf mold in geraniums
 Ceratosporella elegans, a synonym for Ceratosporella bicornis, a species
 Collemopsidium elegans, a lichenized fungus found in Europe and in North and South America
 Corethropsis elegans, a species found in association with the sugarcane in Argentina
 Corynesporina elegans, a species

Higher fungi, phylum Basidiomycota (basidiomycetes)

Subdivision Agaricomycotina

Class Agaricomycetes

Order Agaricales (gilled mushrooms)
 Calcarisporium elegans a species (Catathelasmataceae) known from São Tomé and Príncipe
 Clitocybe elegans, a synonym for Armillaria heimii, a species (Physalacriaceae) that causes root rot on tea trees in eastern Africa
 Collybia elegans a synonym for Marasmius elegans, the velvet parachute, a species (Marasmiaceae) found in eucalypt forests in Australia
 Conocybe elegans, a species (Bolbitiaceae) found in Denmark
 Cortinarius elegans, a species (Cortinariaceae)
 Cyathus elegans, a synonym for Cyathus stercoreus, the dung-loving bird's nest, a species (Nidulariaceae)
 Cystodermella elegans (syn. Cystoderma elegans), a species (Agaricaceae) found in the Congo
 Cyphella elegans (syn. Chaetocypha elegans), a species (Cyphellaceae), possibly an unavailable name

Order Boletales
 Coniophora elegans, a species (Coniophoraceae)
 Cricunopus elegans, a synonym for Suillus grevillei, Greville's bolete or larch bolete, a species (Suillaceae) found in Europe and Asia

Order Cantharellales
Family Cantharellaceae
 Cantharellus elegans Saut., 1841, a mushroom, possibly an unavailable name
 Craterellus elegans, a species
Family Clavulinaceae
 Clavaria elegans, a synonym for Clavulina cristata, a species

Order Phallales
 Caromyxa elegans, Caryomyxa elegans or Corynites elegans, synonyms for Mutinus elegans, the elegant stinkhorn, the dog stinkhorn, the headless stinkhorn or the devil's dipstick, a species (Phallaceae) found in Japan, Europe and eastern North America
 Colus elegans, a synonym for Pseudocolus fusiformis, the stinky squid, a species (Phallaceae) found in the United States, Australia, Japan, Java and the Philippines

Order Polyporales
 Cantharellus elegans Berk. & Broome, 1875, a synonym for Merulius berkeleyi, a species (Meruliaceae)
 Cymatoderma elegans (syn. Cladoderris elegans), a species (Meruliaceae) found in Indonesia

Subphyllum Pucciniomycotina

Class Cystobasidiomycetes
 Cyrenella elegans, a fungus (order incertae sedis)

Class Pucciniomycetes

Order Pucciniales (rusts)
 Caeoma elegans, a species (not yet assigned to a family)
 Caeomurus elegans or Coeomurus elegans, synonyms for Uromyces elegans, a species (Pucciniaceae)

Other fungi

Phylum Blastocladiomycota

Class Blastocladiomycetes

Order Blastocladiales
 Coelomomyces elegans, a species (Coelomomycetaceae) found on Culex gelidus in Sri Lanka

Phylum Chytridiomycota

Class Chytridiomycetes

Order Chytridiales
 Chytridium elegans, a species (Chytridiaceae)
 Chytriomyces elegans, a saprophytic species (Chytriomycetaceae)

Order Cladochytriales
 Cladochytrium elegans, a synonym for Nowakowskiella elegans, a species (Cladochytriaceae)

Phylum Zygomycota (zygote fungi)

Class Zygomycetes, order Mucorales
Family Mucoraceae
 Chaetocladium elegans, a species
 Chaetostylum elegans , a synonym for Helicostylum elegans, a species
Family Cunninghamellaceae
 Cunninghamella elegans, a species found in soil and also used as a model of mammalian xenobiotics metabolism

Eukaryotes, unranked Bikonta (bikonts), kingdom Archaeplastida

Division Rhodophyta (red algae)

Class Stylonematophyceae

Order Stylonematales
 Callonema elegans, a synonym for Stylonema alsidii (Stylonemataceae), a marine species with a worldwide distribution

Class Florideophyceae

Order Bonnemaisoniales
 Calocladia elegans, a synonym for Delisea elegans, a species (Bonnemaisoniaceae)

Order Ceramiales
 Callithamnion elegans, a synonym for Gymnothamnion elegans, a species (Wrangeliaceae) found in South Africa
 Capraella elegans, a synonym for Martensia elegans, a species (Delesseriaceae) found in South Africa
 Ceramium elegans or Conferva elegans, synonyms for Ceramium diaphanum var. elegans, a red alga (Ceramiaceae)

Order Colaconematales
 Colaconema elegans, a marine species (Colaconemataceae) found in Korea, California and Brazil

Order Gigartinales
 Chondracanthus elegans, a red alga (Gigartinaceae)
 Claudea elegans, a marine species (Delesseriaceae) found in tropical waters in Australia, India, Pakistan and Brazil

Order Peyssonneliales
 Cruoriella elegans, a species (Peyssonneliaceae) found in the southern islands of Japan

Class Rhodophyceae

Order Corallinales
Family Corallinaceae (coralline algae)
 Cheilosporum elegans, a synonym for Jania cultrata, a species (Corallinoideae)
 Corallina elegans, a species (Corallinoideae) from the Mediterranean Sea and the North Atlantic Ocean
 Corallina elegans Lenormand ex Areschoug, 1852, a synonym for Jania rubens var. corniculata, a subspecies (Corallinoideae)

Subkingdom Plantae (plants)

(Informal group green algae), division Chlorophyta (chlorophytes)

Class Chlorophyceae

Order Chaetophorales
 Chaetophora elegans, a species (Chaetophoraceae)

Order Charales
 Chara elegans, a species (Characeae)

Order Chlorosarcinales
 Chlorosarcina elegans, a terrestrial species (Chlorosarcinaceae)

Order Cladophorales
 Cladophora elegans f. major, a synonym for Cladophora vagabunda, a marine species (Cladophoraceae) with a worldwide distribution

Order Volvocales
 Chlamydobotrys elegans, a synonym for Pyrobotrys elegans, a species (Spondylomoraceae)
 Chlamydomonas elegans, a freshwater species (Chlamydomonadaceae)
 Chlorogonium elegans, a species (Haematococcaceae)

Unranked Streptophyta (streptophytes), (green algae), division Charophyta (charophytes)

Class Zygnematophyceae

Order Desmidiales
 Closterium elegans, a synonym for Closterium setaceum, a species (Closteriaceae) with a worldwide distribution
 Cosmarium elegans, a synonym for Cosmarium tetragonum var. elegans, a subspecies (Desmidiaceae)

Order Zygnematales
 Conjugata elegans, a species (Zygnemataceae)

Streptophytes, unranked Embryophyta (embryophytes) (non-vascular plants or bryophytes)

Division Marchantiophyta (liverworts)

Class Jungermanniopsida, order Jungermanniales
 Cephaloziella elegans (syn. Cephalozia elegans), a species (Cephaloziellaceae) found in the Russian Federation
 Ceramanus elegans, a leafy liverwort (Lepidoziaceae) found in New Zealand
 Cololejeunea elegans, a species (Lejeuneaceae) found in Cameroon

Division Bryophyta (mosses)

Class Bryopsida, order Hypnales
 Chaetomitrium elegans, a species (Symphyodontaceae)
 Cleistostoma elegans, a synonym for Dendropogonella rufescens, a species (Cryphaeaceae) found in South America

Streptophytes, embryophytes, unranked Tracheophyta (vascular plants)

Division Pteridophyta (ferns), class Pteridopsida (leptosporangiate ferns)

Order Polypodiales (or Athyriales)
 Cyclosorus elegans, a species (Thelypteridaceae) found in China

Unranked Spermatophyta (spermatophytes), division Cycadophyta, class Cycadopsida (cycads)

Order and family unknown
 †Cycadophyllum elegans, an extinct species from the Triassic of Germany

Spermatophytes, division †Pteridospermatophyta (seed ferns)

Order †Medullosales
Family †Cyclopteridaceae
 †Cyclopteris elegans Lesquereux, 1854, an extinct species from the Carboniferous of Pennsylvania, United States
 †Cyclopteris elegans Unger, 1856
 †Cyclopteris elegans Achepohl, 1883, an extinct species from Westphalia, Germany

Spermatophytes, basal angiosperms

Order Nymphaeales
 Castalia elegans, a synonym for Nymphaea elegans, the tropical royalblue water-lily, an aquatic plant (Nymphaeaceae) found in Louisiana, Florida and Texas in the United States, in Oaxaca in Mexico and in Antioquia in Colombia

Spermatophytes, angiosperms (flowering plants), dicotyledons

Eudicots, asterids, order Asterales
Family Asteraceae

Subfamily Asteroideae
 Calea elegans, a synonym for Perymenium acuminatum, a species (Heliantheae) found in Mexico
 Calostelma elegans, a synonym for Liatris elegans, the pinkscale gayfeather, pinkscale blazingstar or elegant blazingstar, a species (Eupatorieae) native to the southeastern United States 
 Calycadenia elegans, a synonym for Calycadenia pauciflora, the smallflower western rosinweed, a species (Madieae) found in California
 Chaetopappa elegans, a synonym for Ionactis elegans, the Sierra Blanca least-daisy, a species (Astereae) found only in New Mexico in the western United States
 Chevreulia elegans, a synonym for Chevreulia acuminata, a species (Gnaphalieae) found in South America
 Chrysothamnus elegans, a synonym for Chrysothamnus viscidiflorus subsp. lanceolatus, the yellow rabbitbrush or green rabbitbrush, a species (Astereae) found in North America
 Coreopsis elegans or Calliopsis elegans, two synonyms for Coreopsis tinctoria, the plains coreopsis, a species (Coreopsideae) common to much of the United States
 Crassina elegans, a synonym for Zinnia elegans, a species (Heliantheae) native to Mexico

Subfamily Carduoideae
 Centaurea elegans, a synonym for Centaurea cineraria, the velvet centaurea, a species (Cynareae) found in Italy
 Cousinia elegans, a synonym for Cousinia multiloba, a species (Cynareae) found in Afghanistan

Subfamily Cichorioideae
 Cacalia elegans, a synonym for Lessingianthus elegans, a species (Vernonieae) found in Bolivia
 Crepis elegans, a synonym for Askellia elegans, the elegant hawksbeard, a species (Cichorieae) found in North America

Subfamily Mutisioideae
 Chaetanthera elegans, a species (Mutisieae) found in Chile
 Clarionea elegans, a synonym for Perezia magellanica, a species (Nassauvieae) found in Argentina and Chile

Family Campanulaceae
 Campanula elegans, a species (Campanuloideae) 
 Clintonia elegans, a synonym for Downingia elegans, the elegant calicoflower or Californian lobelia, a species (Lobelioideae) native to western North America from California to British Columbia

Eudicots, asterids, order Lamiales
 Caldenbachia elegans, a synonym for Stenandrium pohlii, Portuguese names caiapiá or carapiá, a species (Acanthaceae) native to the Cerrado and Pantanal vegetation of Brazil
 Callitriche elegans, a synonym for Callitriche palustris, the spiny water starwort, a species of aquatic plants (Plantaginaceae)
 Castilleja elegans, the elegant Indian paintbrush, a herbaceous plant (Orobanchaceae) found in Canada
 Chionanthus elegans, a synonym for Chionanthus crassifolius, a species (Oleaceae) found in Brazil
 Citharexylum elegans, a synonym for Rhaphithamnus venustus, the Juan Bueno, a species (Verbenaceae) endemic to the Juan Fernández Islands, an archipelago west of Chile
 Clytostoma elegans, synonym of Bignonia noterophila

Family Gesneriaceae
 Chirita elegans, a synonym for Primulina swinglei, a species found in China and Vietnam
 Codonanthe elegans, a species found in Belize
 Columnea elegans, a synonym for Columnea minor, a species found in Ecuador
 Cyrtandra elegans, a species found in Indonesia and Papua New Guinea

Family Lamiaceae
 Callicarpa elegans, a species found in the Philippines
 Colquhounia elegans, a shrub found in Asia
 Condea elegans, a species (Nepetoideae) found in South America

Eudicots, asterids, order Gentianales
Family Apocynaceae
 Capuronetta elegans, a synonym for Tabernaemontana capuronii, a species (Rauvolfioideae) found in Madagascar
 Centrostemma elegans or Cyrtoceras elegans, synonyms for Hoya celebica, a species (Asclepiadoideae) found in Indonesia
 Ceropegia elegans, a species found in India and Sri Lanka
 Conopharyngia elegans, a synonym for Tabernaemontana elegans, the toad tree, a species (Rauvolfioideae) found eastern Africa
 Cryptolepis elegans, a synonym for Cryptolepis sinensis, a species
 Cynanchum elegans, the white-flowered wax plant, a species found in New South Wales in Australia

Family Rubiaceae
 Cleisocratera elegans, a synonym for Saprosma elegans, a species (Rubioidea) found in Indonesia
 Condaminea elegans, a species found in Peru
 Coprosma elegans, a species found in New Guinea

Eudicots, asterids, order Solanales
Nightshades (family Solanaceae)
 Calibrachoa elegans, a plant found in Minas Gerais in Brazil
 Cestrum elegans, the purple cestrum, a plant (Cestroideae)

Family Convolvulaceae
 Convolvulus elegans, a synonym for Bonamia elegans, a plant found in Myanmar
 Cuscuta elegans, a synonym for Cuscuta babylonica var. elegans, a species found in Iraq and Turkmenistan

Eudicots, asterids, order Apiales
Family Apiaceae
 Carum elegans, a synonym for Bunium elegans, a species (Apioideae, Pyramidoptereae) found in Syria
 Chaerophyllum elegans, a species (Apioideae, Scandiceae, Scandicinae) found in the Alps from Switzerland, France and Italy
 Cryptotaenia elegans, also known in Spanish as perejil de Monteverde (parsley of Monteverde), a species (Apioideae, Oenantheae) endemic to the Canary Islands

Eudicots, asterids, order Ericales
 Chrysophyllum elegans Raunk. ex Warm., a synonym for Chrysophyllum flexuosum, a tree (Sapotaceae) found in Brazil
 Chrysophyllum elegans (Vink) Baehni, a synonym for Pycnandra elegans, a tree (Sapotaceae) found in New Caledonia
 Cleyera elegans, a synonym for Freziera undulata, a species (Pentaphylacaceae) found in the Caribbean
 Cyclamen elegans, a plant (Primulaceae) found in northern Iran and southeastern Azerbaijan

Eudicots, rosids, order Celastrales
 †Celastrinites elegans, an extinct species (Celastraceae) from the Eocene Florissant fossil bed of Colorado

Eudicots, rosids, order Malvales
Family Cistaceae
 Cistus elegans, a synonym for Cistus salviifolius, the sage-leaved rock-rose, salvia cistus or Gallipoli rose, a species native to the Mediterranean region, in southern Europe and parts of western Asia and North Africa

Family Malvaceae
 Callianthe elegans, a plant (Malveae) found in Brazil
 Cola elegans, a species of trees (Sterculioideae) found in Gabon
 Cristaria elegans, a plant native to Chile

Eudicots, rosids, order Myrtales
Family Myrtaceae
 Calyptranthes elegans, a species found in the Lesser Antilles
 Calyptromyrcia elegans, a synonym for Myrcia guianensis, the pedra-ume-caá, a species (Myrtoideae) found in South America
 Carpolepis elegans, a synonym for Metrosideros elegans, a tree endemic to New Caledonia
 Caryophyllus elegans, a synonym for Syzygium elegans, a species found in New Caledonia

Family Melastomataceae
 Carionia elegans, a species
 Clidemia elegans, a synonym for Clidemia hirta, the soapbush or Koster's curse, an invasive species found in many tropical regions of the world

Other families
 Clarkia elegans, a synonym for Clarkia unguiculata, the elegant clarkia, a species (Onagraceae) found in California
 Combretum elegans, a synonym for Combretum rotundifolium, the monkey brush, a species (Combretaceae) found in South America
 Crypteronia elegans, a tree (Crypteroniaceae) found in Sarawak
 Cuphea elegans, a species (Lythraceae) native to Brazil

Eudicots, rosids, order Fabales
Family Fabaceae (legumes)
 Calliandra elegans, a species (Mimosoideae) found in Brazil
 Callisemaea elegans, a species found in Mesoamerica
 Cassia elegans, a synonym for Senna septemtrionalis, the arsenic bush, a species (Caesalpinioideae)
 Cavaraea elegans, a synonym for Tamarindus indica, the tamarind, a species (Detarioideae) indigenous to tropical Africa
 Chamaefistula elegans, a synonym for Senna obliqua, a species (Caesalpinioideae, Cassieae) found in Peru
 Chesneya elegans, a species (Faboideae) found in Turkey
 Chorizema elegans, a synonym for Chorizema varium, a species (Faboideae) found in Australia
 Coronilla elegans, a synonym for Securigera elegans, a species
 Crotalaria elegans, a synonym for Crotalaria peduncularis, a species (Faboideae, Crotalarieae) found in India
 Cryptosepalum elegans, a species (Caesalpinioideae) found in Angola

Eudicots, rosids, order Fagales
Family Casuarinaceae
 Casuarina elegans, a synonym for Allocasuarina littoralis, the black sheoak, black she-oak or river black-oak, a species endemic to Australia

Eudicots, rosids, order Malpighiales
Family Salicaceae
 Casearia elegans, a synonym for Casearia bartlettii, a species found in Belize and Guatemala

Family Euphorbiaceae
 Chamaesyce elegans, a synonym for Euphorbia elegans, a species (Euphorbioideae)
 Claoxylon elegans, a synonym for Claoxylon longifolium, a species (Acalyphoideae) found in Assam, Southeast Asia, New Guinea and Caroline Islands
Crotonoids (subfamily Crotonoideae)
 Codiaeum elegans, a synonym for Codiaeum variegatum, the garden croton or variegated croton, a plant (Codiaeae) native to Indonesia, Malaysia, Australia and the western Pacific Ocean islands
 Croton elegans, a shrub (Crotoneae) endemic to the Ecuadorean Andes

Family Calophyllaceae
 Calophyllum elegans, a tropical tree found in Asia
 Clusiella elegans, a species found in Colombia

Eudicots, rosids, order Brassicales
 Capparis elegans (syn. Capparidastrum elegans), a species (Capparaceae) found in Brazil
 Corynandra elegans, the elegant spider-flower, a species (Cleomaceae) found in the Konkan region of Maharashtra, India

Family Brassicaceae (crucifers)
 Capsella elegans, a synonym for Capsella bursa-pastoris, the shepherd's purse, a species native to eastern Europe and Asia Minor but naturalized elsewhere
 Chorispora elegans or Chorispermum elegans, synonyms for Chorispora sabulosa, a species found in China and Pakistan
 Clypeola elegans, a species found in Turkey

Eudicots, rosids, order Rosales
Family Rhamnaceae
 Ceanothus elegans, a synonym for Ceanothus thyrsiflorus, the blueblossom or blue blossom ceanothus, a species endemic to California

Family Rosaceae
 Chabertia elegans, a species
 Coluria elegans, a synonym for Coluria longifolia, a species (Rosoideae) found in China
 Cotoneaster elegans, a species (Amygdaloideae) found in China
 Crataegus elegans, a synonym for Crataegus monogyna, the common hawthorn or single-seeded hawthorn, a species (Amygdaloideae) native to Europe, northwest Africa and western Asia

Eudicots, rosids, order Sapindales
Family Burseraceae
 Canarium elegans, a species found in Madagascar

Family Rutaceae
 Conchocarpus elegans (syn. Cusparia elegans), a species found in Brazil

Family Sapindaceae
 Cardiospermum elegans, a synonym for Cardiospermum grandiflorum, the balloon vine, heart pea or heart seed, a climbing plant found in Argentina and Brazil
 Cupania elegans, a horticultural name (a name that has never been validly published in scientific literature) for a species (Sapindoideae)

Eudicots, rosids, order Geraniales
Family Geraniaceae
 Campylia elegans, a synonym for Pelargonium elegans, a species found in South Africa

Family Vivianiaceae
 Cissarobryon elegans, a species

Eudicots, rosids, order Vitales
Family Vitaceae
 Cissus elegans, a species

Eudicots, rosids, order Cucurbitales
Family Begoniaceae
 Casparya elegans, a synonym for Begonia foliosa, a species found in Colombia and Venezuela

Family Cucurbitaceae
 Corallocarpus elegans, a species (Cucurbitoideae) found in Africa
 Cyclanthera elegans, a synonym for Cyclanthera tenuisepala, a species found in Costa Rica

Eudicots, order Ranunculales
Family Menispermaceae
 Cocculus elegans, a synonym for Cocculus orbiculatus, the queen coralbead, a woody vine found from India east to Java
 Cyclea elegans, a species found in Sumatra, Malaya, Borneo

Family Papaveraceae
 Corydalis elegans (syn. Capnoides elegans), a species (Fumarioideae) found in India, China and the western Himalayas

Family Ranunculaceae
 Cheiropsis elegans, a synonym for Clematis cirrhosa, a species (Ranunculoideae)

Eudicots, core eudicots, order Caryophyllales
 Calandrinia elegans, a species (Portulacaceae)
 Calligonum elegans, a plant (Polygonaceae) found in Uzbekistan
 Cerastium elegans, a synonym for Cerastium cerastoides, a plant (Caryophyllaceae) found in mountain regions of Europe
 Conophytum elegans, a succulent plant (Aizoaceae)

Family Cactaceae (cacti)
 Cactus elegans Link, a synonym for Disocactus phyllanthoides, a species (Cactoideae, Hylocereeae) native to Mesoamerica
 Cactus elegans (DC.) Kuntze, a synonym for Mammillaria elegans, a species (Cactoideae, Cacteae) native to Mexico
 Cereus elegans, a cactus (Cactoideae, Cereeae)

Eudicots, core eudicots, order Santalales
 Comandra elegans, a synonym for Comandra umbellata, the bastard toadflax, umbellate bastard toadflax or common comandra, a species found in North America and the Mediterranean

Eudicots, core eudicots, order Saxifragales
 Crassula elegans, the elegant crassula, a plant (Crassulaceae)

Magnoliids, order Laurales
Family Lauraceae
 Cinnamomum elegans, a species found in Samoa
 Cryptocarya elegans, a species

Flowering plants, monocotyledons

Commelinids, order Arecales
Family Arecaceae (palms)
 Calamus elegans, a species (Calamoideae)
 Calyptrocalyx elegans, a species (Arecoideae) found in Papua New Guinea and the nearby Maluku Islands
 Caryota elegans, a species (Coryphoideae, Caryoteae)
 Chamaedorea elegans (syn. Collinia elegans), the neanthe bella palm or parlour palm, a species (Arecoideae, Hyophorbeae) native to the rainforests in southern Mexico and Guatemala
 Chamaerops elegans, a synonym for Chamaerops humilis, the European fan palm or the Mediterranean dwarf palm, a cold-hardy species (Coryphoideae, Trachycarpeae) used in landscaping in temperate climates
 Coccothrinax elegans, a species (Coryphoideae) found in Cuba
 Cyphophoenix elegans, a species found only in New Caledonia
 Cyrtostachys elegans, a species (Arecoideae) endemic to New Guinea

Family Dasypogonaceae
 Calectasia elegans, the elegant tinsel lily, a species found in Western Australia

Commelinids, order Poales
Family Cyperaceae (sedges)
 Carex elegans, a synonym for Carex limosa, the mud sedge and shore sedge, a species found across North America and Eurasia
 Cyperus elegans, the royal flatsedge, a species from Central and South America

Family Eriocaulaceae
 Comanthera elegans, a species found in Minas Gerais, Brazil

Family Poaceae (bamboos and grasses)
Subfamily Chloridoideae
 Calotheria elegans, a synonym for Enneapogon elegans, a species (Eragrostideae) found in Myanmar and Tamil Nadu, India
 Chloris elegans, a synonym for Chloris virgata, the feather fingergrass or feather windmillgrass, a species native to many of the warmer temperate, subtropical and tropical regions of the world
 Ctenium elegans (syn. Campulosus elegans), a species found from Senegal to the Sudan

Subfamily Panicoideae
 Callichloea elegans, a synonym for Elionurus elegans, a species (Andropogoneae) found in Nigeria and Senegal
 Cenchrus elegans, a species (Paniceae) found in Malesia
 Ceresia elegans, a synonym for Paspalum ceresia, a species found in South America
 Cymbopogon elegans, a species

Subfamily Pooideae (cool-season grasses)
 Calamagrostis elegans, a synonym for Calamagrostis eminens, a species (Poeae, Agrostidinae) found in South America
 Calotheca elegans or Chascolytrum elegans, synonyms for Chascolytrum brizoides, a species (Poeae, Brizinae) found in Buenos Aires, Uruguay, Rio Grande do Sul and Biobio
 Cynosurus elegans (syn. Chrysurus elegans), a species (Poeae, Cynosurinae) found in southern Europe, northern Africa, Middle East and Turkmenistan

Subfamily Bambusoideae (bamboos)
 Chusquea elegans, a species (Bambuseae) found in Paraná, Brazil

Commelinids, order Commelinales
Family Commelinaceae
 Callisia elegans, a synonym for Callisia gentlei var. elegans, a subspecies (Commelinoideae) found in Oaxaca, Chiapas, Guatemala and Honduras
 Commelina elegans, a synonym for Commelina erecta, the white mouth dayflower or slender dayflower, a perennial herb native throughout the Americas, Africa and western Asia

Commelinids, order Zingiberales
 Calathea elegans, a plant (Marantaceae) found in Colombia and Panama
 Canna elegans, a synonym for Canna glauca, a species (Cannaceae) from the wetlands of tropical America
 Costus elegans, a synonym for Costus malortieanus, a species (Costaceae) found in Costa Rica, Nicaragua and Honduras

Order Asparagales
Family Amaryllidaceae
 Crinum elegans, a synonym for Crinum lorifolium, a species (Amaryllidoideae) found in India and Myanmar

Family Asparagaceae
 Caloscilla elegans, a synonym for Scilla peruviana, the Portuguese squill, a species (Scilloideae) native to the western Mediterranean region in Iberia, Italy and northwest Africa

Family Iridaceae
 Crocus elegans, a species (Crocoideae) found in Turkey
 Cypella elegans, a herbaceous plant found in Argentina

Family Orchidaceae (orchids)
Subfamily Orchidoideae (orchidoid orchids)
 Caladenia elegans (syn. Calonema elegans or Calonemorchis elegans), the elegant spider-orchid, a species found in Western Australia
 Chloraea elegans, a species found in Argentine
 Cyclopogon elegans, a species found in Brazil and Argentina
 Cynorkis elegans, a species found in Madagascar

Subfamily Epidendroideae (epidendroid orchids)
 Cattleya elegans, a synonym for Cattleya × elegans, a hybrid (Epidendreae, Laeliinae) found in Brazil
 Cestichis elegans, a synonym for Liparis elegans, a species (Malaxideae) found in Southeast Asia (Indonesia, Papua New Guinea)
 Cirrhopetalum elegans, an epiphytic species (Dendrobieae, Bulbophyllinae) found in Malaya
 Cleisostoma elegans, a synonym for Cleisostoma williamsoni, Williamson's cleisostom, a species (Vandeae) found in Asia
 Crocodeilanthe elegans, a synonym of Stelis roseopunctata
 Cymbidium elegans (syn. Cyperorchis elegans), a species (Cymbidieae) found in southwestern China
 Crepidium elegans, a species (Malaxideae) found in Malesia
 Cyrtopodium elegans, a synonym for Tetramicra canaliculata, a species (Epidendreae, Laeliinae) found in Florida, Hispaniola, Puerto Rico, Trinidad and the Lesser Antilles
 Cephalanthera elegans, a synonym for Cephalanthera erecta, a species (Neottieae, Limodorinae) found in China, Japan, Korea, Kuril Islands, Bhutan, Assam and eastern Himalayas

Subfamily Cypripedioideae (lady's-slippers)
 Cypripedium elegans (syn. Coelogyne elegans), a species found in Nepal and China

Order Liliales
Family Liliaceae
 Calochortus elegans (synonym Cyclobothra elegans (Pursh) Benth.), the elegant mariposa lily or cat's ear, a plant found in the western United States from northern California to Montana
 Cyclobothra elegans Torr., a synonym for Calochortus coeruleus, the beavertail grass or blue star tulip, a species endemic to California

Order Pandanales
Family Cyclanthaceae
 Carludovica elegans, a species found in Peru

Vascular plants, division Pteridophyta (ferns), class Polypodiopsida

Order Hymenophyllales
 Cephalomanes elegans, a filmy fern (Hymenophyllaceae)

Order Polypodiales (polypod ferns)
 Callipteris elegans, a synonym for Diplazium fraxinifolium, a species (Athyriaceae) found in Asia
 Cheilanthes elegans, a synonym for Cheilanthes myriophylla, the Central American lace fern, a species (Pteridaceae) native as far south as Argentina
 Colysis elegans, a species (Polypodiaceae) found in China

Vascular plants, division Pteridophyta (ferns), class Pteridopsida

Order Cyatheales (tree ferns)
 Cyathea elegans, a synonym for Cyathea grevilleana, a species (Cyatheaceae) found in Jamaica

Vascular plants, division Pinophyta (conifers)

Class Pinopsida, order Pinales
Family Cupressaceae
 †Cunninghamites elegans (syn. Cunninghamia elegans), an extinct species from the Late Cretaceous of Europe
 Callitris elegans, a species (Callitroideae) described from Australia

Family Pinaceae
 Cedrus elegans, a synonym for Cedrus libani, the cedar of Lebanon or Lebanon cedar, a species native to the mountains of the eastern Mediterranean basin

Plants awaiting allocation
 †Circulisporites elegans, a species known from Triassic spores and pollen grains

Eukaryotes, unranked SAR (SAR supergroup)

Unranked Rhizaria

Phylum Retaria

Subphylum Foraminifera, class Globothalamea

Order Rotaliida
 Cassidulina elegans, a synonym for Globocassidulina elegans, a marine species (Cassidulinidae) found in the Japanese and New Zealand exclusive economic zones
 †Cibicides elegans, an extinct species (Cibicididae) from the Tertiary of the Dominican Republic
 Cibusoides elegans, a benthonic species (Heterolepidae) from the Pacific Ocean
 †Cyclammina elegans, an extinct species (Cyclamminidae) from the Cretaceous of Trinidad and from New Zealand

Subclass Textulariia, order Loftusiida
 †Cuneolina elegans, an extinct species (†Cuneolinidae) from the Lower Paleogene of Austria

Subclass Textulariia, order Textulariida
 †Clavulina elegans, a synonym for †Arenodosaria antipodum, an extinct species (Eggerellidae) known from the Miocene of New Zealand

Subphylum Foraminifera, class Tubothalamea

Order Miliolida
 †Cristellaria elegans, an extinct species (Peneroplidae)

Subphylum Radiozoa (radiolarians), class Polycystina

Order Nassellaria
 Clathrocyclas elegans, a species (Theoperidae)
 †Cornutanna elegans, an extinct species from the Miocene of Italy

Order Spumellaria
 †Cana elegans, an extinct species (†Pantanelliidae) from the Cretaceous of northwest Turkey
 †Cenellipsis elegans, a species (incertae sedis) from the Paleocene of western Kuban
 Cromyatractus elegans, a species (incertae sedis) from the northwestern Pacific Ocean

Phylum Cercozoa

Class Granofilosea

Order Desmothoracida
 Clathrulina elegans, a heliozoan species (Clathrulinidae) found in freshwater environments

Class Phaeodaria

Order Phaeogromia or Phaeocalpida
 Castanidium elegans, a species (Castanellidae) found in the Sargasso Sea and in the current around the Canary Islands

Superphylum Alveolata (alveolates)

Phylum Ciliophora (ciliates)

Class Oligohymenophorea

Order Apostomatida
 Chromidina elegans, a species (Opalinopsidae) parasite of the cuttlefish Sepia elegans described from Naples, Italy

Order Philasterida
 Cryptochilum elegans, a synonym for Uronema elegans, a species (Uronematidae) found in Norway

Order Sessilida
 Cothurnia elegans, a species of pritrichs (Vaginicolidae) found in Australia

Class Phyllopharyngea

Order Exogemmida
 Cavichona elegans, a species (Spirochonidae)

Phylum Dinoflagellata (dinoglagellates)

Class Dinophyceae

Order Peridiniales
 Centrodinium elegans, a synonym for Oxytoxum elegans, a species (Oxytoxaceae) found in the Gulf of Mexico, the Lebanese exclusive economic zone waters and the North Atlantic Ocean
 Corythodinium elegans, a species (Oxytoxaceae) with a worldwide distribution

Order Gonyaulacales
 Ceratium elegans Schröder, 1906, a synonym for Tripos elegans, a species (Ceratiaceae)
 †Clathroctenocystis elegans, an extinct species (Microdiniaceae) from the Cretaceous of Alaska, United States
 †Cleistosphaeridium elegans, a synonym for †Impletosphaeridium elegans, an extinct species (incertae sedis) from the Early Tertiary

Class Noctiluciphyceae

Order Noctilucales
 Cymbodinium elegans, a marine species (Kofoidiniaceae)

Superphylum Heterokonta or Heterokontophyta (heterokonts)

Phylum Ochrophyta

Class Xanthophyceae (yellow-green algae)

Order Mischococcales
 Characiopsis elegans, a freshwater species (Characiopsidaceae) described from Arkansas, North America, and Brazil, South America

Class Chrysophyceae (golden-brown algae)

Order Chromulinales
 Chromulina elegans, a freshwater species (Chromulinaceae) found in Europe, South America and Asia
 Chrysococcus elegans (syn. Chrysococcocystis elegans), a freshwater species (Dinobryaceae) found in North America

Class Bacillariophyceae (diatoms)

Subclass Coscinodiscophyceae, order Chaetocerotales
 Chaetoceros elegans, a species (Chaetocerotaceae) found in Taiwan

Subclass Bacillariophycidae, order Achnanthales
 Cocconeis elegans, a species (Cocconeidaceae) found in Sicily

Orders Cymbellales
 Cymbella elegans, a species (Cymbellaceae)

Order Surirellales
 Campylodiscus elegans, a species (Surirellaceae)

Subclass Fragilariophyceae, order Climacospheniales
 Climacosphenia elegans, a marine pennate species (Climacospheniaceae)

Order incertae sedis
 †Cladogramma elegans, an extinct species from the scientific voyage of HMS Challenger
 Cladomphalus elegans, a species from California
 †Corinna elegans, an extinct species from the Cretaceous of Canada
 †Cosmiodiscus elegans, an extinct species
 †Craspedoporus elegans, an extinct marine species from a deposit from Oamaru, Otago, New Zealand

Class Coscinodiscophyceae

Order Coscinodiscales
Family Coscinodiscaceae
 Coscinodiscus elegans, a species found in the Gulf of Mexico
 Craspedodiscus elegans, a species

Eukaryotes, unranked Hacrobia (cryptomonads-haptophytes assemblage)

Phylum Haptophyta (haptophytes)

Class Prymnesiophyceae

Order Prymnesiales
 Chrysochromulina elegans, a species (Prymnesiaceae) found in Baltic Sea in Europe and in Brazil in South America

Phylum Cryptophyta (cryptomonads or cryptophytes)

Class Cryptophyceae

Order Pyrenomonadales
 Chroomonas elegans, a species (Chroomonadaceae) found in Lake Neusiedl, at the Austria-Hungarian border

Order Cryptomonadales
 Cryptaulax elegans, a species (Cryptomonadaceae) found in tropical marine sediments

Eukaryotes incertae sedis, unranked Acritarcha (acritarchs)
 †Cheleutochroa elegans, an extinct species from the Ordovician of Estonia
 †Coryphidium elegans, an extinct species from the Tremadocian, the lower age of the Ordovocian, of Morocco

(Prokaryota or prokaryotes) domain Bacteria (bacteria)

Phylum Cyanobacteria (blue-green algae)

Order Synechococcales
 Cyanonephron elegans, a freshwater species (Synechococcaceae) described in the Netherlands, Russia and Australia

Domain incertae sedis
 †Clonophycus elegans, an extinct species of microalgae found in the Barney Creek Formation of the Middle Proterozoic of northern Australia

Species names sorted in alphabetical order
 
Cacalia elegans
Cacia elegans
Cacogamia elegans
Cacopsylla elegans
Cacozelia elegans
Cactus elegans
Cacyparis elegans
Caecilius elegans
Caecum elegans
Caelopygus elegans
Caelostomus elegans
Caenorhabditis elegans
Caenotherium elegans
Caenura elegans
Caeoma elegans
Caeomurus elegans
Caestocorbula elegans
Cainotherium elegans
Caladenia elegans
Calamagrostis elegans
Calamaria elegans
Calamophylliopsis elegans
Calamus elegans
Calandra elegans
Calandrinia elegans
Calanus elegans
Calaphidius elegans
Calathea elegans
Calcarisporium elegans
Calceolispongia elegans
Calceostoma elegans
Calcinus elegans
Caldenbachia elegans
Calea elegans
Calectasia elegans
Caledonomorpha elegans
Caledothele elegans
Calephorus elegans
Caliapora elegans
Calibrachoa elegans
Caligulus elegans
Caligus elegans
Caliris elegans
Callhistia elegans
Callianassa elegans
Calliandra elegans
Callianthe elegans
Calliaster elegans
Callibracon elegans
Callicarpa elegans
Callicella elegans
Callichloea elegans
Callichroma elegans
Callidemum elegans
Calliderma elegans
Callidina elegans
Callienispia elegans
Calligonum elegans
Calligrapha elegans
Callimormus elegans
Callinethis elegans
Calliomphalus elegans
Callionima elegans
Callionymus elegans
Calliopsis elegans
Calliostoma elegans
Callipepla elegans
Calliprason elegans
Callipteris elegans
Callipterus elegans
Calliscelio elegans
Callisemaea elegans
Callisia elegans
Callispa elegans
Callista elegans
Callisthenes elegans
Callistocythere elegans
Callistola elegans
Callistomimus elegans
Callistrophia elegans
Calliteara elegans
Callithamnion elegans
Callitriche elegans
Callitris elegans
Callizonus elegans
Callocardia elegans
Callocladia elegans
Callocossus elegans
Callogorgia elegans
Callograptus elegans
Callomyia elegans
Callonema elegans
Callopisma elegans
Callopisma elegans
Callotillus elegans
Callyspongia elegans
Calocalanus elegans
Calocheiridius elegans
Calochortus elegans
Calocitta elegans
Calocladia elegans
Calodromas elegans
Calofulcinia elegans
Calogoniodiscus elegans
Calohilara elegans
Calolampra elegans
Calonema elegans
Calonemorchis elegans
Calopezus elegans
Calophyllum elegans
Caloplaca elegans
Calopotosia elegans
Calopteryx elegans
Caloria elegans
Caloscilla elegans
Calosoma elegans
Calospeira elegans
Calosphaera elegans
Calostelma elegans
Caloteleia elegans
Calotheca elegans
Calotheria elegans
Calycadenia elegans
Calyptoproctus elegans
Calyptranthes elegans
Calyptrocalyx elegans
Calyptromyrcia elegans
Camallanus elegans
Camarotoechia elegans
Cambraster elegans
Cambridgea elegans
Camillina elegans
Campanula elegans
Campanulotes elegans
Camphotherium elegans
Campodorus elegans
Camponotus elegans
Campoplex elegans
Campsotrichum elegans
Campterophlebia elegans
Campulosus elegans
Campylia elegans
Campylodiscus elegans
Campyloneurus elegans
Cana elegans
Canalisporium elegans
Canarium elegans
Cancellaria elegans
Cancelloceras elegans
Cancricepon elegans
Candelabrella elegans
Canna elegans
Cantharellus elegans
Cantharus elegans
Canthon elegans
Capnodium elegans
Capnoides elegans
Capparidastrum elegans
Capparis elegans
Capraella elegans
Caprellinoides elegans
Capromys elegans
Capsella elegans
Capsodes elegans
Capula elegans
Capulus elegans
Capuronetta elegans
Caputoraptor elegans
Carbasea elegans
Carbonicola elegans
Carcharias elegans
Cardiacephala elegans
Cardiaphyllum elegans
Cardiastethus elegans
Cardiocondyla elegans
Cardioglossa elegans
Cardiophorus elegans
Cardiorhinus elegans
Cardiospermum elegans
Cardiosyne elegans
Cardita elegans
Carenum elegans
Carex elegans
Carinostoma elegans
Carinthiaphyllum elegans
Carionia elegans
Carludovica elegans
Caromyxa elegans
Carphurus elegans
Carpolepis elegans
Carteriospongia elegans
Cartodere elegans
Carum elegans
Carvalhodrymus elegans
Caryanda elegans
Caryanda elegans
Caryomyxa elegans
Caryophyllus elegans
Caryota elegans
Casearia elegans
Casparya elegans
Casphalia elegans
Cassia elegans
Cassidulina elegans
Castalia elegans
Castanidium elegans
Castilleja elegans
Casuarina elegans
Catalabus elegans
Catalebeda elegans
Catalina elegans
Cataloipus elegans
Catantops elegans
Catapaecilma elegans
Catascopus elegans
Catenicella elegans
Catenipora elegans
Catenospegazzinia elegans
Catharesthes elegans
Catopygus elegans
Cattleya elegans
Caucasorhynchia elegans
Caulophacus elegans
Caulospongia elegans
Caupolicana elegans
Cautires elegans
Cavaraea elegans
Cavernularia elegans
Cavichona elegans
Cavilucina elegans
Cayluxotherium elegans
Ceanothus elegans
Ceccaisculitoides elegans
Cecidocharella elegans
Cecidomyia elegans
Cedrus elegans
Celastrinites elegans
Celeus elegans
Cenchrus elegans
Cenellipsis elegans
Cenomyce elegans
Centaurea elegans
Centridermichthys elegans
Centrinaspis elegans
Centris elegans
Centrocardita elegans
Centrocerum elegans
Centrodinium elegans
Centropages elegans
Centrophthalmus elegans
Centropyxiella elegans
Centrostemma elegans
Centruroides elegans
Centrurus elegans
Cephalanthera elegans
Cephalaspis elegans
Cephalochetus elegans
Cephalodella elegans
Cephalodiplosporium elegans
Cephalomanes elegans
Cephaloplatus elegans
Cephalosporium elegans
Cephalostenus elegans
Cephalota elegans
Cephalozia elegans
Cephaloziella elegans
Cepon elegans
Cerachalcis elegans
Ceraeochrysa elegans
Ceramanus elegans
Cerambix elegans
Cerambyx elegans
Ceramium elegans
Cerapachys elegans
Ceraspis elegans
Cerastium elegans
Ceratites elegans
Ceratium elegans
Ceratodus elegans
Ceratomyxa elegans
Ceratopodium elegans
Ceratosporella elegans
Cercaria elegans
Cerceris elegans
Cercinthus elegans
Cerdistus elegans
Cereatta elegans
Ceresia elegans
Cereus elegans
Cerithiopsida elegans
Cerithiopsis elegans
Cerithium elegans
Cerobates elegans
Cerodrillia elegans
Ceropales elegans
Ceropegia elegans
Ceroplesis elegans
Cesonia elegans
Cestichis elegans
Cestrotus elegans
Cestrum elegans
Cethegus elegans
Cetoconcha elegans
Cetonia elegans
Ceuthophilus elegans
Ceutorhynchus elegans
Chabertia elegans
Chaenon elegans
Chaerocampa elegans
Chaerodrys elegans
Chaerophyllum elegans
Chaetanthera elegans
Chaetoceros elegans
Chaetocladium elegans
Chaetocypha elegans
Chaetoderma elegans
Chaetomitrium elegans
Chaetonotus elegans
Chaetopappa elegans
Chaetophora elegans
Chaetosphaeria elegans
Chaetospila elegans
Chaetostylum elegans
Chaetothyriothecium elegans
Chalara elegans
Chalarostylis elegans
Chalcogenia elegans
Chalcoscirtus elegans
Chalcosyrphus elegans
Chalinissa elegans
Chalinodendron elegans
Chalinopsilla elegans
Chama elegans
Chamaedorea elegans
Chamaefistula elegans
Chamaemyia elegans
Chamaerops elegans
Chamaesyce elegans
Championa elegans
Chandleria elegans
Chapra elegans
Chara elegans
Characiopsis elegans
Characodoma elegans
Charadrius elegans
Chariaster elegans
Chariessa elegans
Chariesthes elegans
Chascolytrum elegans
Chatterjeea elegans
Cheilanthes elegans
Cheiloneurus elegans
Cheilosporum elegans
Cheilotomona elegans
Cheiracanthium elegans
Cheiromoniliophora elegans
Cheiropsis elegans
Cheleutochroa elegans
Chelidonura elegans
Chelifer elegans
Chelisia elegans
Chelisoches elegans
Chelonus elegans
Chenopus elegans
Chersine elegans
Chersotis elegans
Chesneya elegans
Chevreulia elegans
Chilenchus elegans
Chilina elegans
Chiliospora elegans
Chiloneus elegans
Chionanthus elegans
Chiridota elegans
Chirita elegans
Chirodota elegans
Chironomus elegans
Chirostenotes elegans
Chitaura elegans
Chitonomyces elegans
Chlaenius elegans
Chlamydobotrys elegans
Chlamydomonas elegans
Chlamydotheca elegans
Chloraea elegans
Chloris elegans
Chlorizeina elegans
Chlorogonium elegans
Chlorolestes elegans
Chloromastax elegans
Chloropsina elegans
Chlorosarcina elegans
Chlorostilbon elegans
Choanocotyle elegans
Choeridium elegans
Choetospila elegans
Choilodon elegans
Chomatodus elegans
Chondracanthus elegans
Chondria elegans
Chonetes elegans
Choniognathus elegans
Chorisastrea elegans
Chorispermum elegans
Chorispora elegans
Choristes elegans
Chorizema elegans
Chorizocarpa elegans
Chortoicetes elegans
Chromatopterum elegans
Chromidina elegans
Chromodoris elegans
Chromulina elegans
Chronogaster elegans
Chroomonas elegans
Chrysallida elegans
Chrysemys elegans
Chrysis elegans
Chrysochernes elegans
Chrysochloris elegans
Chrysochroa elegans
Chrysochromulina elegans
Chrysococcocystis elegans
Chrysococcus elegans
Chrysogaster elegans
Chrysogorgia elegans
Chrysolampus elegans
Chrysoliocola elegans
Chrysomela elegans
Chrysopetalum elegans
Chrysophyllum elegans
Chrysophyllum elegans
Chrysopidia elegans
Chrysopilus elegans
Chrysopophthorus elegans
Chrysothamnus elegans
Chrysotoxum elegans
Chrysotus elegans
Chrysso elegans
Chrysurus elegans
Chunula elegans
Chusquea elegans
Chyliza elegans
Chytonix elegans
Chytridium elegans
Chytriomyces elegans
Cibicides elegans
Cibusoides elegans
Cicerina elegans
Cicerocrinus elegans
Cicindela elegans
Cidaris elegans
Cidarites elegans
Cimex elegans
Cimmerites elegans
Cinctipora elegans
Cingula elegans
Cinnamomum elegans
Circobotys elegans
Circulisporites elegans
Cirrhopetalum elegans
Cissarobryon elegans
Cissus elegans
Cistus elegans
Citellus elegans
Citharexylum elegans
Cladobotryum elegans
Cladochalina elegans
Cladochytrium elegans
Cladoderris elegans
Cladodus elegans
Cladognathus elegans
Cladogramma elegans
Cladomphalus elegans
Cladophora elegans
Cladoselache elegans
Cladospongia elegans
Cladosporium elegans
Clanoptilus elegans
Claoxylon elegans
Clarionea elegans
Clarkia elegans
Clarkometra elegans
Clathria elegans
Clathrissa elegans
Clathroctenocystis elegans
Clathrocyclas elegans
Clathrulina elegans
Claudea elegans
Clausotrypa elegans
Clavagella elegans
Clavaria elegans
Clavelina elegans
Clavulina elegans
Cleiothyridina elegans
Cleisocratera elegans
Cleisostoma elegans
Cleistosphaeridium elegans
Cleistostoma elegans
Clema elegans
Cleonymus elegans
Cleopus elegans
Cleora elegans
Cleptes elegans
Cleviceras elegans
Cleyera elegans
Clianella elegans
Clidemia elegans
Climacosphenia elegans
Clinocephalus elegans
Clintonia elegans
Clinus elegans
Clitocybe elegans
Clivina elegans
Cloacina elegans
Clonia elegans
Clonophycus elegans
Clossiana elegans
Closterium elegans
Closterocoris elegans
Clusiella elegans
Clypeola elegans
Clytus elegans
Cneorane elegans
Cnephalocotes elegans
Cnesinus elegans
Cobalopsis elegans
Cobitis elegans
Coccocarpia elegans
Cocconeis elegans
Coccothrinax elegans
Cocculus elegans
Cochlespira elegans
Cochlostoma elegans
Cochylimorpha elegans
Codiaeum elegans
Codonanthe elegans
Codonosiga elegans
Codonosmilia elegans
Coelacanthus elegans
Coelinidea elegans
Coelinius elegans
Coelogyne elegans
Coelomomyces elegans
Coelopleurus elegans
Coeloria elegans
Coenites elegans
Coenocalpe elegans
Coenocharopa elegans
Coenosia elegans
Coenura elegans
Coeomurus elegans
Cola elegans
Colaconema elegans
Coleonyx elegans
Coleophora elegans
Coleoxestia elegans
Colias elegans
Collaria elegans
Collemopsidium elegans
Colletes elegans
Collinia elegans
Colliuris elegans
Collocheres elegans
Collybia elegans
Collyris elegans
Colobaspis elegans
Cololejeunea elegans
Colopalpus elegans
Colpocraspeda elegans
Colpodes elegans
Colpophyllia elegans
Colposcelis elegans
Colposcenia elegans
Colpostigma elegans
Colquhounia elegans
Coluber elegans
Columbella elegans
Columbinia elegans
Columnea elegans
Coluria elegans
Colus elegans
Colymbetes elegans
Colysis elegans
Comandra elegans
Comanthera elegans
Comatricha elegans
Combretum elegans
Comitas elegans
Commelina elegans
Commius elegans
Comophyllia elegans
Comphotherium elegans
Compsocerocoris elegans
Compsoctenus elegans
Compsocus elegans
Compsopsectra elegans
Compsoscorpius elegans
Compsus elegans
Comptonia elegans
Conasprella elegans
Conchocarpus elegans
Conchoecia elegans
Condaminea elegans
Condea elegans
Conferva elegans
Congestheriella elegans
Coniatus elegans
Coniocarpon elegans
Coniophora elegans
Conioscinella elegans
Conistra elegans
Conjugata elegans
Conocephalites elegans
Conochitina elegans
Conocybe elegans
Conoderus elegans
Conomyrma elegans
Conopharyngia elegans
Conophytum elegans
Conops elegans
Conosmilia elegans
Conotrachelus elegans
Conradella elegans
Consobrinomia elegans
Constantia elegans
Conus elegans
Convoluta elegans
Convolvulus elegans
Coprosma elegans
Coptaspis elegans
Coptoclavella elegans
Coptocycla elegans
Coptodryas elegans
Coptomia elegans
Coptorhynchus elegans
Coptosoma elegans
Corallina elegans
Corallocarpus elegans
Corallomyces elegans
Corallomycetella elegans
Coranus elegans
Corbicula elegans
Corbis elegans
Corbitella elegans
Corbula elegans
Corbulamella elegans
Cordulecerus elegans
Cordylocera elegans
Cordylomera elegans
Coregonus elegans
Coreopsis elegans
Coreopsomela elegans
Corephorus elegans
Corethromyces elegans
Corethropsis elegans
Coreus elegans
Corinna elegans
Corixa elegans
Cormocephalus elegans
Cornufer elegans
Cornularia elegans
Cornutanna elegans
Coronella elegans
Coronilla elegans
Coronium elegans
Coronocephalus elegans
Correbia elegans
Correbidia elegans
Cortinarius elegans
Corydalis elegans
Corydia elegans
Corydoras elegans
Corydorus elegans
Corymbites elegans
Corynandra elegans
Corynesporina elegans
Corynites elegans
Corynomalus elegans
Corynoptera elegans
Coryphaena elegans
Coryphidium elegans
Coryphocera elegans
Corythodinium elegans
Corythucha elegans
Coscinium elegans
Coscinodiscus elegans
Coscinopleura elegans
Cosmacanthus elegans
Cosmarium elegans
Cosmiodiscus elegans
Cosmocoma elegans
Cosmoderes elegans
Cosmodes elegans
Cosmosoma elegans
Costentalina elegans
Costonia elegans
Costria elegans
Costus elegans
Cothurnia elegans
Cotoneaster elegans
Coturnicops elegans
Cousinia elegans
Crambus elegans
Craniella elegans
Craniops elegans
Craspedocephalus elegans
Craspedochiton elegans
Craspedodiscus elegans
Craspedonema elegans
Craspedophorus elegans
Craspedoplax elegans
Craspedopoma elegans
Craspedoporus elegans
Crassina elegans
Crassolabium elegans
Crassostrea elegans
Crassula elegans
Crataegus elegans
Craterellus elegans
Cratocentrus elegans
Crella elegans
Crematogaster elegans
Crenatula elegans
Crendonites elegans
Crenella elegans
Crenicara elegans
Crenicichla elegans
Creniphilus elegans
Creoleon elegans
Crepidium elegans
Crepis elegans
Cretapsyche elegans
Cribella elegans
Cribraria elegans
Cribrella elegans
Cribrosoconcha elegans
Cribrospongia elegans
Cricosaurus elegans
Cricotopus elegans
Cricunopus elegans
Crinistrophia elegans
Crinum elegans
Crioceras elegans
Crioceratites elegans
Criodion elegans
Crisia elegans
Cristaria elegans
Cristellaria elegans
Crocisa elegans
Crocodeilanthe elegans
Crocus elegans
Cromna elegans
Cromyatractus elegans
Crosita elegans
Crossocheilus elegans
Crotalaria elegans
Croton elegans
Cruoriella elegans
Cryptandromyces elegans
Cryptanuridimorpha elegans
Cryptarcha elegans
Cryptaulax elegans
Crypteronia elegans
Cryptobium elegans
Cryptocarya elegans
Cryptocatantops elegans
Cryptocheilus elegans
Cryptocheiridium elegans
Cryptochile elegans
Cryptochilum elegans
Cryptoditha elegans
Cryptographis elegans
Cryptolaria elegans
Cryptolepis elegans
Cryptomeigenia elegans
Cryptopygus elegans
Cryptorhynchus elegans
Cryptosepalum elegans
Cryptospira elegans
Cryptotaenia elegans
Ctenacanthus elegans
Ctenelmis elegans
Ctenicera elegans
Ctenium elegans
Ctenochasma elegans
Ctenophora elegans
Cuapetes elegans
Cubanocheiridium elegans
Cubanohydracarus elegans
Cubanothyris elegans
Cubitostrea elegans
Cucujomyces elegans
Cucullaea elegans
Cucullanus elegans
Culeolus elegans
Culex elegans
Cumingia elegans
Cuneolina elegans
Cunninghamella elegans
Cunninghamia elegans
Cunninghamites elegans
Cupania elegans
Cuphea elegans
Cupuladria elegans
Cupulospongia elegans
Curculio elegans
Curimata elegans
Curimatus elegans
Cursoria elegans
Curtognathus elegans
Cuscuta elegans
Cusoria elegans
Cusparia elegans
Cuspidaria elegans
Cuterebra elegans
Cyanonemertes elegans
Cyanonephron elegans
Cyartonema elegans
Cyathea elegans
Cyathophora elegans
Cyathopodium elegans
Cyathus elegans
Cybiosarda elegans
Cycadophyllum elegans
Cyclagnostus elegans
Cyclamen elegans
Cyclammina elegans
Cyclanorbis elegans
Cyclanthera elegans
Cyclas elegans
Cyclaspis elegans
Cyclea elegans
Cyclobothra elegans
Cyclocardia elegans
Cyclocephala elegans
Cyclophorus elegans
Cyclopina elegans
Cyclopinodes elegans
Cyclopinoides elegans
Cyclopogon elegans
Cyclops elegans
Cyclopteris elegans
Cycloseris elegans
Cyclosorus elegans
Cyclostoma elegans
Cyclostrema elegans
Cyclostrongylus elegans
Cyclothyris elegans
Cyerce elegans
Cylindrocladiella elegans
Cylindrostoma elegans
Cymatoceras elegans
Cymatoderma elegans
Cymbachus elegans
Cymbella elegans
Cymbidium elegans
Cymbodinium elegans
Cymbopogon elegans
Cymindis elegans
Cymodusa elegans
Cymothoa elegans
Cymus elegans
Cynanchum elegans
Cynodictis elegans
Cynodonichthys elegans
Cynolebias elegans
Cynorkis elegans
Cynosurus elegans
Cypella elegans
Cyperorchis elegans
Cyperus elegans
Cyphella elegans
Cyphocerastis elegans
Cypholoba elegans
Cyphomyia elegans
Cyphophoenix elegans
Cypraea elegans
Cypraedia elegans
Cypraeovula elegans
Cypricardinia elegans
Cypricercus elegans
Cyprinodon elegans
Cypripedium elegans
Cyptocephala elegans
Cyrene elegans
Cyrenella elegans
Cyrestis elegans
Cyriocosmus elegans
Cyriocrates elegans
Cyrtandra elegans
Cyrtoceras elegans
Cyrtolites elegans
Cyrtonus elegans
Cyrtopodion elegans
Cyrtopodium elegans
Cyrtopora elegans
Cyrtosia elegans
Cyrtostachys elegans
Cyrtotrachelus elegans
Cyrtotyphlus elegans
Cystoderma elegans
Cystodermella elegans
Cystodictya elegans
Cystomatochilina elegans
Cystoseira elegans
Cythere elegans
Cytherea elegans
Cytherideis elegans
Cytospora elegans

See also
 C. c. elegans (disambiguation)
 C. inelegans (disambiguation)
 C. elegantissima (disambiguation) and C. elegantissimum (elegantissima-mum meaning "most elegant")
 C. elegantula (disambiguation) ("elegantula" is a diminutive form of "elegans", hence has the meaning of small and elegant)
 C. elegans elegans (disambiguation)
 Available name / Unavailable name (terms used in zoology)
 Validly published name (terms used in botany)

References

 "C. elegans is a valid abbreviation for 41 different species in the NCBI taxonomy." Linnaeus: A species name identification system for biomedical literature. Martin Gerner, Goran Nenadic and Casey M Bergman, BMC Bioinformatics, 2010, volume 11, page 85,

External links

 AlgaeBase
 Atlas of Living Australia
 BioLib.cz
 Barcode of Life Data System 
 Encyclopedia of Life 
 Fishbase 
 Fossilworks
 Index Fungorum
 Insectoid.info
 Louisiana State Arthropod Museum
 Mycobank
 The Reptile Database
 Tropicos
 World Register of Marine Species (WoRMS)